= IWI Tavor 7 =

Israeli bullpup battle rifle

- Type: Bullpup battle rifle
- Place of origin: Israel

Production history
- Designer: Israel Weapon Industries
- Designed: 2013–2017
- Manufacturer: Israel Weapon Industries
- Variants: See Variants

Specifications
- Mass: 4.1 kg (9.04 lb) (unloaded)
- Length: 730 mm (28.7 in) 806 mm (31.7 in)
- Cartridge: 7.62×51mm NATO
- Action: Short-stroke gas-operated, rotating bolt
- Rate of fire: 600-900 rounds/min
- Feed system: SR-25 pattern magazines (7.62×51mm NATO)
- Sights: Meprolight MOR with integrated laser and IR pointer, Trijicon ACOG, Meprolight M5 and other optical sights

The IWI Tavor 7 is an Israeli bullpup battle rifle chambered in 7.62×51mm NATO cartridge designed and produced by Israel Weapon Industries (IWI) as part of the Tavor rifle family. It is a fully ambidextrous rifle.

== Design ==
The Tavor 7 is in a bullpup configuration, the same as all the other rifles in the family. It uses a short-stroke gas piston system, unlike the two previous rifles, which utilized a long-stroke gas piston system from Kalashnikov rifles (Galil was an earlier project incorporating it). This decreases recoil, as there is not as much mass cycling with each shot. The Tavor 7 also has a gas regulator with four positions: regular (R), adverse/extreme (A), suppressed/suppressor (S), and off/closed, intended for special operations. It has a hammer-forged, chrome-lined and free-floating barrel, with four RH grooves with a 1:12" right hand rifling twist. The Tavor 7 is fed by SR-25 pattern magazines.

The Tavor 7's external aesthetics are very similar to the original Tavor TAR-21, while the controls are similar to the Tavor X95. The magazine release and charging handle are in nearly identical places as the X95, and the bolt release is in the same place as the last two rifles. The selector switch is the same, except that the semi-auto selection is at a 45-degree angle instead of a 90-degree angle. The handguard is removable, and comes with integrated picatinny rails at the 6 and 12 o'clock positions, as well as M-LOK slots at the 3 and 9 o'clock positions for attaching compatible devices, including picatinny rail sections; it also comes with a removable rail cover to cover the 6 o'clock rail when not in use. The main receiver of the Tavor 7 comes with a picatinny rail across the top.

The ejection on the Tavor 7 can be reversed by pulling the brass deflector open to the opposite side of the port and then turning it 180 degrees, and then doing the same but closing it on the other side; the bolt then also needs to be rotated 180 degrees and the cam pin flipped to the opposite side (indicated by an R or an L). The non-reciprocating charging handle is reversible as well. The charging handle can also be held in the rear position similar to an HK MP5, as well as "slapped" down to release it.

== Variants ==
The Tavor 7 comes with the option of changing out the pistol grip with either the standard Tavor Talon trigger guard, a traditional trigger guard, or any compatible third-party accessory.

=== Tavor 7 ===
The Tavor 7 is the base variant of this rifle, with a 432 mm (17 in) long barrel, and 730 mm (28.7 in) overall length.

==== 20" Barrel ====
Most likely a designated marksman rifle variant, however yet to be separately designated, that is equipped with a 508 mm (20 in) barrel and has an 806 mm (31.7 in) overall length.

=== IWI US ===
All Tavor 7s sold on the U.S. civilian market are semi-automatic only.

T7B16: A regular Tavor 7, but with a 16.5 in (419 mm) barrel and 26.75 in (679.5 mm) overall length.

IWI US sells their Tavor 7s in a variety of colors, including Black (B), Flat Dark Earth (FD), and OD Green (G); the letter "B" in the rifles' designations can be switched with any of the colors' respective letters.

== See also ==
- IWI Tavor TS12
