= IWI Masada =

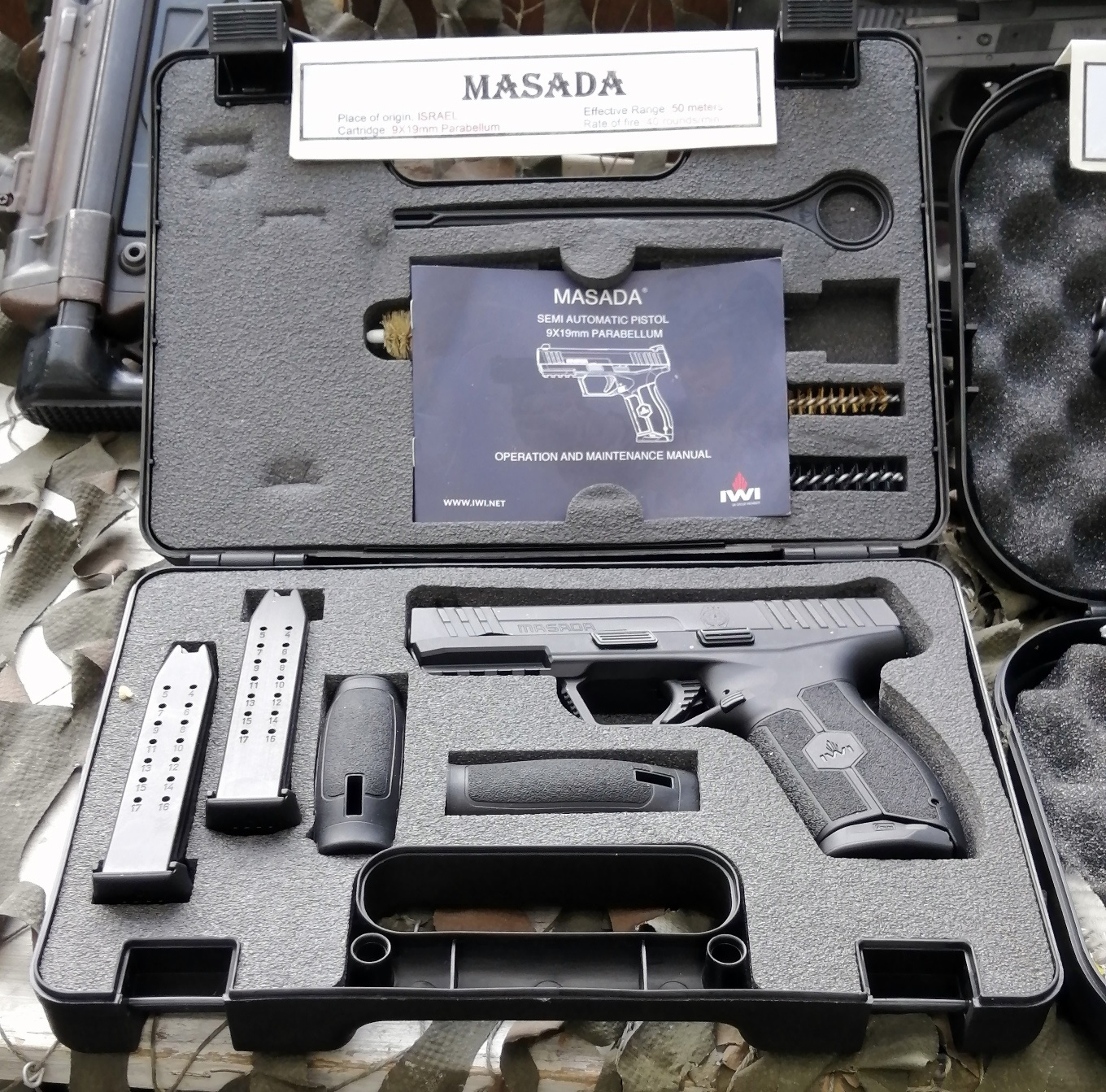
- Type: Semi-automatic pistol
- Place of origin: Israel

Production history
- Manufacturer: Israel Weapon Industries
- Produced: 2017–present

Specifications
- Mass: 650 g
- Length: 189 mm
- Barrel length: 104 mm
- Cartridge: 9×19mm Parabellum
- Action: Short recoil
- Feed system: 17+1 (9×19mm) round detachable box magazine with visible round count
- Sights: Fixed 3-dot Tritium illuminated night sights. White 3-dot sights for the US market Masada.

The IWI Masada (Hebrew: מצדה; lit. 'fortress') is a semi-automatic pistol developed and produced by Israel Weapon Industries in 2017.

== Design ==
The Masada is a striker-fired and recoil-operated weapon designed to suit military, law enforcement and civilian needs.

The Masada comes in four colors (sniper gray, OD green, black and flat dark earth). The US market currently only has black, OD green, and flat dark earth.

== Users ==
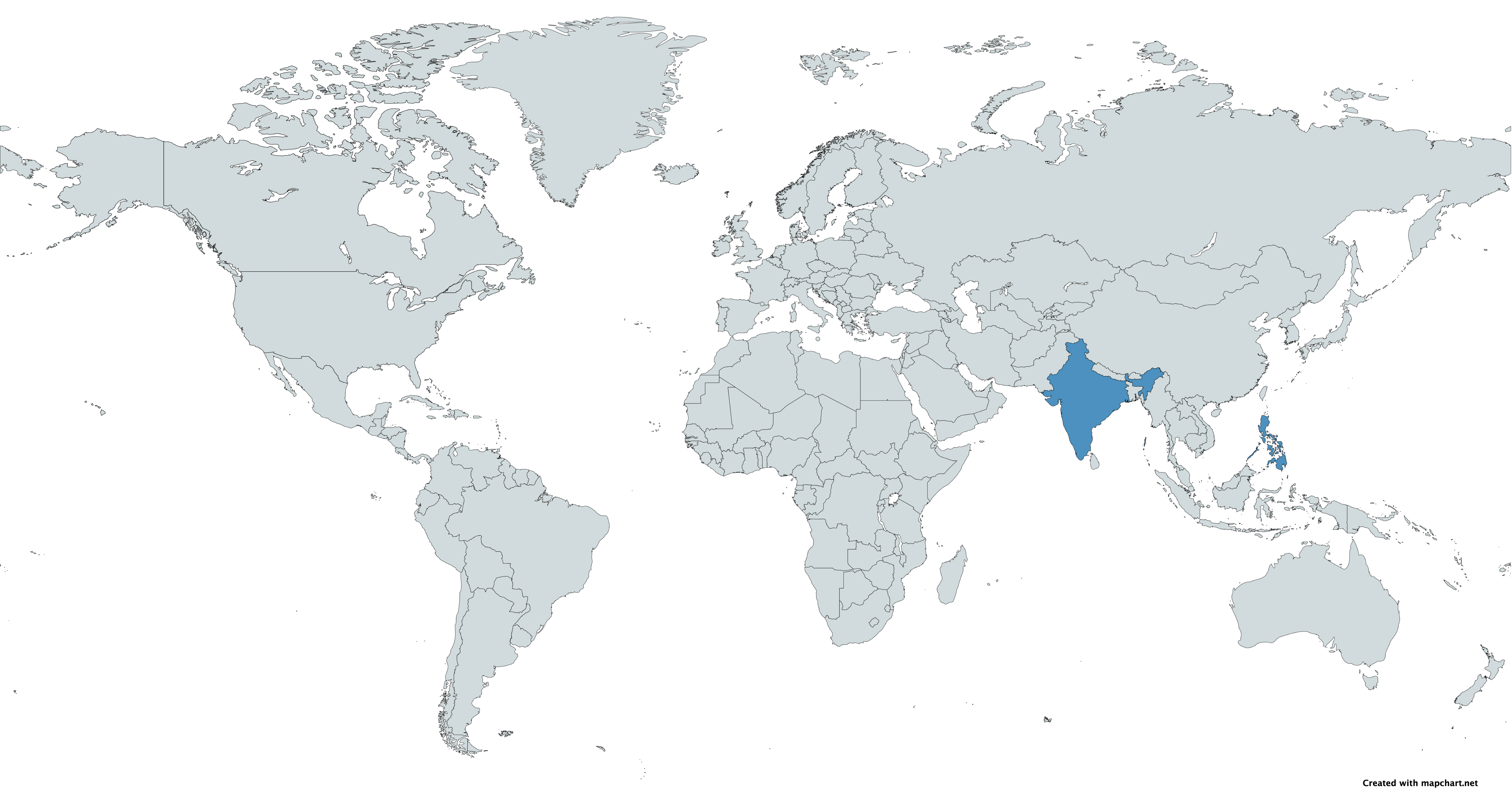
A map with IWI Masada users in blue

- India
  - MARCOS
- Philippines
  - Philippine National Police

== See also ==
- Jericho 941
- SP-21 Barak
- Desert Eagle
