= IWI ARAD =

Israeli assault rifle/carbine

ARAD
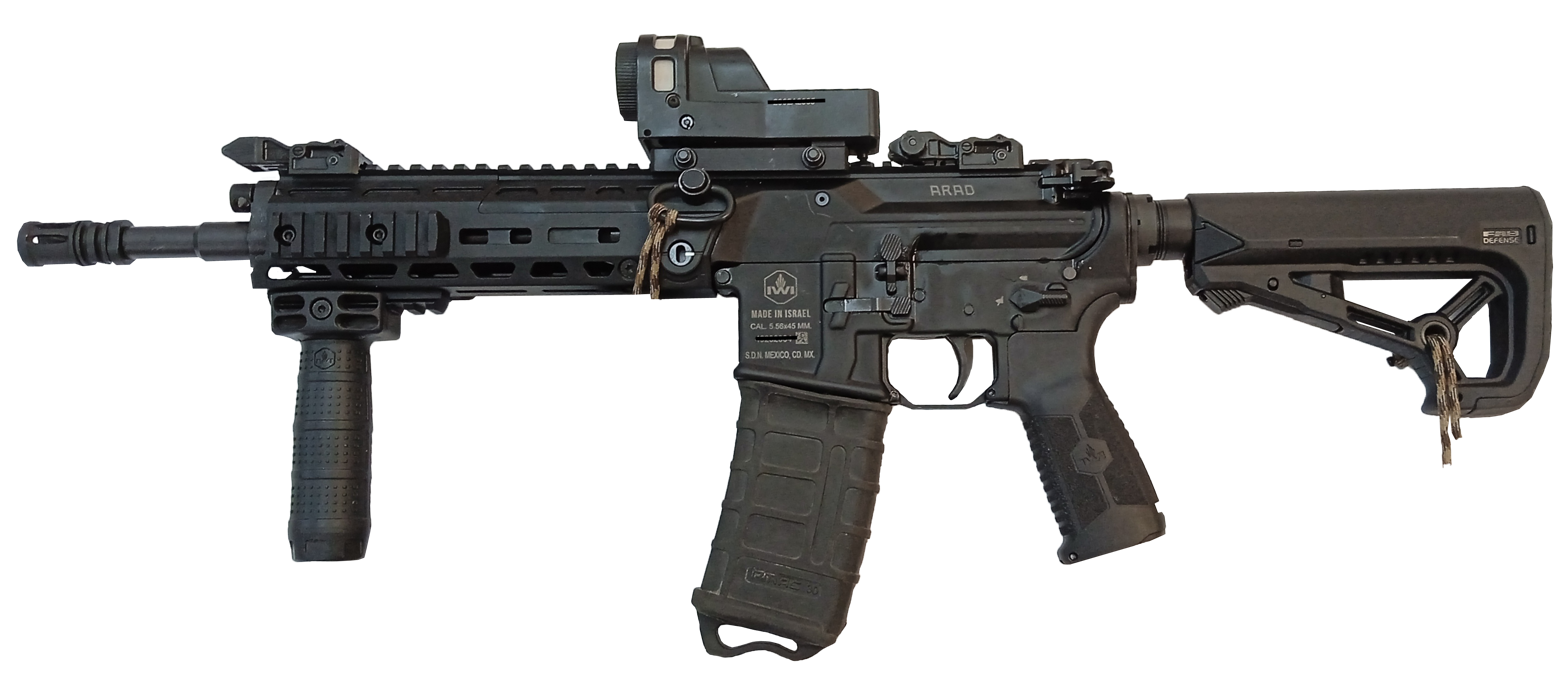
- Type: Carbine; Assault rifle
- Place of origin: Israel

Service history
- In service: 2019-present
- Used by: See Users

Production history
- Designed: 2019
- Manufacturer: Israel Weapon Industries
- Produced: 2019-present

Specifications
- Mass: 2.86-3 kg (unloaded)
- Length: 780 mm (292 mm barrel); 855 mm (368 mm barrel); 895 mm (406 mm barrel)
- Barrel length: 292 mm (11.5 inches); 368 mm (14.5 inches); 406 mm (16 inches)
- Cartridge: .300 Blackout; 5.56×45mm NATO; 7.62×51mm NATO; 6.5 Creedmoor
- Action: Short-stroke gas piston
- Rate of fire: 700-1100 rounds/minute
- Feed system: 30-round detachable STANAG magazine

The ARAD is an AR-15–style assault rifle designed in 2019 by Israel Weapon Industries, named after the Israeli city of Arad.

== Design ==
The ARAD is an assault rifle visually similar to the AR-15, though it uses a short-stroke gas piston more akin to that of the AR-18, rather than the direct impingement system seen in the AR-15. It is chambered in either 5.56×45mm NATO or .300 AAC Blackout and is designed to be modular, allowing a change of caliber through a quick-change barrel. All of its metal parts are corrosion-resistant.

The barrel is cold hammer-forged and chrome-lined for improved accuracy and lifespan (approximately 20,000 rounds). The barrel is free-floated for enhanced accuracy. In the standard models, the accuracy is 1 MOA, and in the DMR model, the accuracy is better.

== Variants ==
=== Arad 5 ===
The IWI Arad is a modular assault rifle designed and manufactured by Israel Weapon Industries.

- Caliber: 5.56×45mm NATO and .300 BLK.
- Weight: 2.85–3.07 kg empty, depending on barrel length.
- Barrel length: 11.5 inches, 14.5 inches
- Rifling twist: 1:7 twist rate
- Effective range: 300–500 meters.
- Accuracy: 1 MOA.

=== Arad 7 ===
The IWI Arad 7 is a heavier battle rifle variant of the Arad.

- Caliber: 7.62×51mm NATO or 6.5mm Creedmoor.
- Weight: 4.15–4.55 kg empty, depending on barrel length.
- Barrel length: 14.5 inches, 16 inches, 18 inches, and 20 inches.
- Rifling twist: 1:12 twist rate.
- Effective range: 300–1000 meters.

=== Arad 7 DMR ===
The IWI Arad 7 DMR is a semi-automatic designated marksman rifle variant of the Arad 7.

- Caliber: 7.62×51mm NATO or 6.5 Creedmoor.
- Weight: 4.27–4.46 kg empty, depending on barrel length.
- Barrel: The Arad features a quick-change barrel system. Available barrel lengths are 16 inches and 20 inches. The barrel is cold hammer-forged and chrome-lined for improved accuracy and lifespan (approximately 20,000 rounds). The barrel is free-floated for enhanced accuracy.
- Rifling twist: 1:10 twist rate.
- Effective range: 500–1,000 meters.
- Accuracy: < 1 MOA.

== Adoption ==
The Arad is primarily designed for export purposes, and is not intended to replace the IWI Tavor X95 currently in service with the Israel Defense Forces. However, the Arad was adopted by the YAMAM after it was found best in tests held by the unit.

The Arad is also assembled in Peru under the Strategic Partnership Agreement signed with the Israel Weapons Industries (IWI) in March 2023 by the Army Weapons and Ammunition Factory (FAME SAC). It is expected to be assembled in the Netherlands as well.

== Users ==
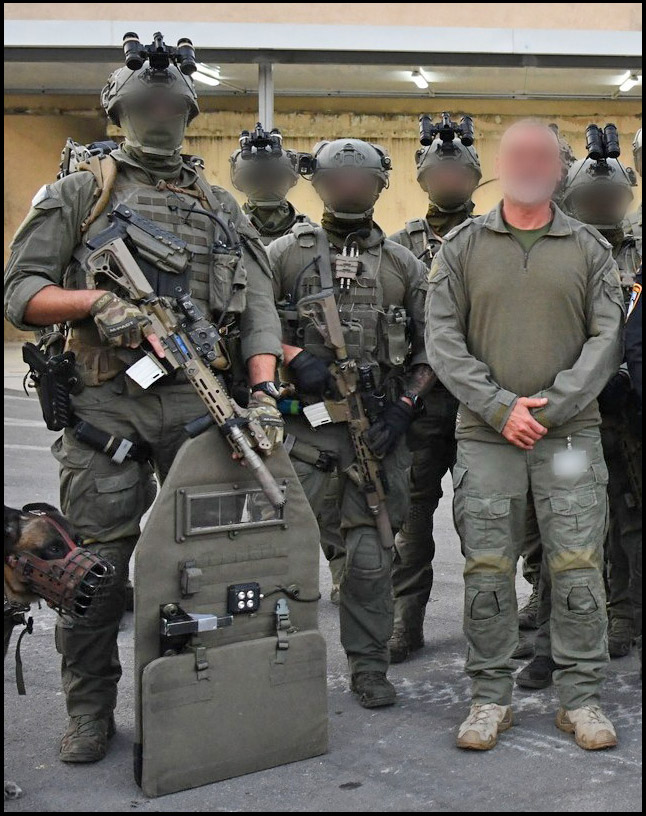
YAMAM operators holding silenced ARAD rifles, 2024.

- Argentina
  - Argentine Army
  - Argentine Navy
  - Argentine Air Force
- Brazil
  - Military Police of São Paulo State
  - Polícia Civil do Estado de São Paulo
  - Military Police of Rio de Janeiro State
  - Military Police of Espírito Santo State
  - Military Police of Paraná State
- Chile
  - Special forces units
- Ecuador
  - Ecuadorian Army
  - Special forces units
- Dominican Republic
  - Dominican Army
  - Dominican Navy
  - Dominican Air Force
  - Special forces units
- India
  - Para (Special Forces)
    - The IWI Arad is manufactured in India by PLR Systems and has been adopted to modernize the close-quarter battle (CQB) and tactical weapon systems of the Indian Armed Forces, including elite units.
- Israel
  - Yamam
  - Israeli Border Police
- Italy
  - 17th Raiders Wing
- Peru
  - Peruvian Armed Forces
  - Peruvian National Police
- Philippines
  - Presidential Security Group
    - 358 units procured and registered for the performance of their duties.
    - Some units distributed to 10th Infantry Division aka Task Force Davao.
