= IWI Dan =

Dan
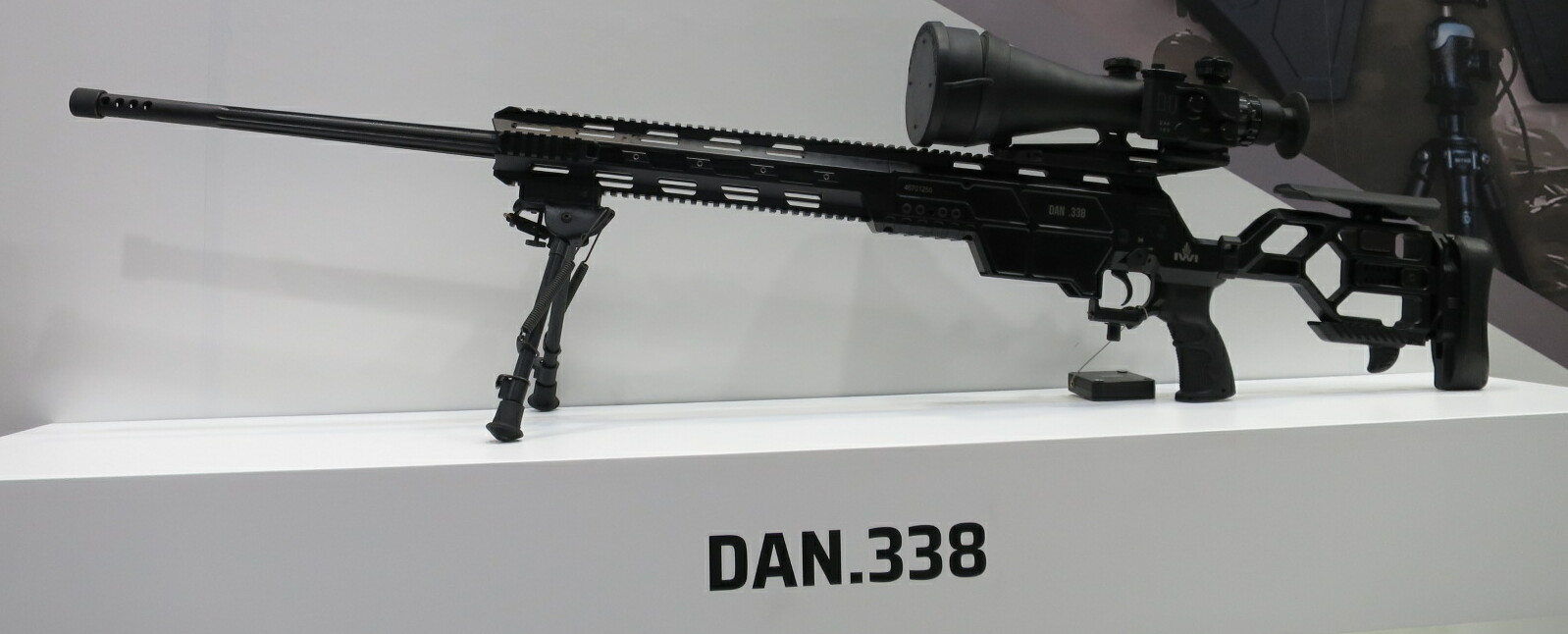
- IWI Dan at IDEX 2023
- Type: Sniper rifle
- Place of origin: Israel

Production history
- Designer: Nehemia Sirkis
- Manufacturer: Israel Weapon Industries
- Unit cost: $9,000
- Produced: 2014–present

Specifications
- Mass: 5.9 kg (13.01 lb); 7.3 kg (16 lb) folding stock version
- Length: 1,280 mm (50.4 in); 1,030 mm (40.6 in) stock folded
- Barrel length: 737 mm (29.0 in)
- Cartridge: .338 Lapua Magnum
- Action: Bolt-action
- Muzzle velocity: 881 m/s (2,890 ft/s)
- Effective firing range: 1200 m
- Feed system: 10-round detachable box magazine
- Sights: day or night optical sights back-up iron sights

The IWI Dan is an Israeli bolt-action sniper rifle manufactured by Israel Weapons Industries (IWI). It is named after the ancient city of Dan. The rifle is chambered for the .338 Lapua Magnum cartridge.

The rifle was designed by Dr. Nehemia Sirkis with cooperation of the Israel Defense Forces special forces and is manufactured by Israel Weapons Industries and marketed worldwide.

It was developed to compete with other 0.338-inch caliber sniper rifles such as the "Barak" used by the IDF, the McMillan TAC-338 (used by IDF elite units and the Navy SEALs), the British AWM, and the PGM 338.

The IWI Dan was unveiled at the 2014 Eurosatory convention.

== Design and features ==
The rifle is a bolt-action sniper rifle chambered in .338 Lapua Magnum caliber, designed for long-range sniping beyond 800 meters. Its design emphasizes ergonomics and user comfort, with adjustable components such as the buttstock. It features Picatinny rails for mounting various optical sights and tactical accessories. The rifle can also be equipped with sound suppressors. Its chassis is relatively lightweight, enhancing usability.

The rifle uses .338 Lapua Magnum ammunition, a high-power sniper rifle cartridge effective at ranges of 1,200 to 1,500 m (1,300 to 1,600 yd). This ammunition is designed for anti-personnel purposes and is capable of penetrating body armor (vests) with lethal precision. It is also effective against unarmored vehicles.

The Manufacturer IWI guarantees sub-MOA accuracy, with estimates suggesting up to 0.3 MOA.
