= IWI Carmel =

Rifle platform manufactured by Israel Weapon Industries

- Type: Assault rifle Semi-automatic rifle
- Place of origin: Israel

Service history
- Used by: See users

Production history
- Designed: 2019
- Manufacturer: Israel Weapon Industries
- Unit cost: $1,799 USD (MSRP)
- Variants: See variants

Specifications
- Mass: 8.125 lb (without magazine)
- Length: 26.74 in (stock folded); 33.75 in (stock collapsed); 37.25 in (stock extended)
- Cartridge: 5.56×45mm NATO
- Caliber: 5.56 mm (.223 in)
- Action: Gas-operated short-stroke piston, rotating bolt
- Rate of fire: 700–1,000 rounds/min
- Feed system: 30-round STANAG box magazine
- Sights: Iron sights, and various optical sights by the use of Picatinny rails

The IWI Carmel was originally designed as an assault rifle capable of fully automatic fire, but the final design became a semi-automatic rifle. It is manufactured by Israeli Weapon Industries, and exported by IWI US to the U.S. commercial and law enforcement market. It was first revealed at the LAAD Defense & Security exhibition in Rio in April 2019.

== Design details ==
The IWI Carmel is a short-stroke, gas-piston operated rifle chambered in 5.56x45mm, similar to the CZ BREN 2 and the FN SCAR-L. The free-floating barrel is chrome lined and cold hammer-forged, with a 1:7 twist rate and available in a variety of barrel lengths: 10.5", 12", 14.5", 16" and 18.6" (for the Canadian market in a non-restricted version).

The IWI Carmel features fully ambidextrous firing controls, an adjustable gas regulator, and a foldable polymer buttstock. It is compatible with any STANAG magazine, and available in black or desert tan.

At the SHOT Show in January 2023, IWI revealed a variant for the U.S. civilian market, with a 16" barrel and a M-LOK handguard replacing the original MIL-STD 1913 handguard. The overall length measures 37.25 inches (stock fully extended) and weighs 8 lb 2 oz unloaded. MSRP for the rifle is US$1,799.
