= IWI Zion-15 =

American-made AR-15 by Israel Weapon Industry US

Zion-15
- Type: AR-15
- Place of origin: United States

Production history
- Manufacturer: IWI US
- Produced: 2020-present

Specifications
- Mass: 6.9 lbs without magazine
- Length: 33 inches (stock collapsed); 36.25 inches (stock extended)
- Barrel length: 16 inches
- Caliber: 5.56×45mm NATO
- Action: Direct impingement
- Feed system: 30-round detachable STANAG magazine

The IWI US Zion-15 is an AR-15–style rifle assembled in Middletown, Dauphin County, Pennsylvania by IWI US, originally released in 2020. Marketed at a competitively low price, it is considered to be a budget or entry level rifle designed for American consumers optimized for home defense or competition, chambered in 5.56 NATO.

The rifle has received numerous accolades for its value.

== Design ==
The Zion-15 is IWI's first M4-styled modern sporting rifle. It uses a direct impingement gas system, has a 16-inch barrel with a 1:8 inch twist, has a 15-inch free-floated handguard with M-LOK attachment points, and an adjustable stock, while the upper receiver has a Picatinny top rail.

According to IWI, the Zion-15 has an accuracy of 1 MOA or less; it was tested for over 10,000 rounds with no significant degradation to accuracy.

== Zion-15 pistol ==
IWI US introduced the Zion-15 Pistol (designated the “Z15TAC12”) alongside the Zion-15 rifle in 2020. It comes with a 12.5-inch 4150 chrome moly vanadium HB barrel with a 6-groove, 1-in-8 RH twist, an 11.5-inch free float handguard, an adjustable SB Tactical SBA3 stabilizing brace, and a B5 Systems grip. The pistol weighs 6.5 lbs and has an overall length of 28.5 inches with the brace extended. It was made to be a direct competitor to other AR-15 pistols on the market, including the Smith & Wesson M&P15 pistol & the Ruger AR-556 pistol.

== Zion-25 ==
In May 2025, IWI introduced the Zion-25, an AR-10-style rifle chambered in .308 and 6.5 Creedmoor in a 16” carbine and 18”, 20” and 22” DMR length.
