= Israel Weapon Industries =

Israeli firearms manufacturer

- Type: Private
- Industry: Arms industry
- Founded: 1933; 93 years ago (privatized in 2005)
- Headquarters: Kiryat Gat, Tel Aviv, Israel
- Area served: Worldwide
- Products: Firearms
- Number of employees: Over 500 in Israel (excluding overseas)
- Website: iwi.net

Israel Weapon Industries (IWI), formerly the Magen division of the Israel Military Industries Ltd. (IMI), is an Israeli firearms manufacturer founded in 1933.

Formerly state-owned, the Small Arms Division of IMI was privatized and renamed IWI in 2005.

IWI is one of the world's most famous and bestselling military arms manufacturers. The Magen division rose to international prominence in the 1950s, as the creator of the Uzi, of which over 10 million would be produced, netting billions of dollars for the company. Subsequent well known military exports have included the Jericho 941 semi-automatic pistol, Negev light machine gun, Galil assault rifle, Tavor assault rifle, and the DAN .338 sniper rifle.

IWI develops and manufactures guns used by armies and law enforcement agencies around the world.

== Manufacturing ==
=== Ramat HaSharon ===
For many decades, IWI and the Magen division of Israeli Military Industries before it, has manufactured its weapons in Ramat HaSharon. The factory has for many years been regarded an important component of the manufacturing sector in Ramat HaSharon. In 2017, IWI announced it is planning to construct a new factory in Kiryat Gat, to which its manufacturing will re-locate when completed in 2020. The new Kiryat Gat factory, whose construction will cost NIS 180 million, will employ 560 full-time production workers and engineers on its assembly lines.

=== Overseas ===
==== India ====
IWI owns several factories overseas, for the manufacture of weapons for local markets. In India, IWI is establishing a joint-manufacturing center with Punj Lloyd (with IWI owning 49% of the plant, and Punj Lloyd owning 51% of the plant), which will be India's first privately owned small-arms manufacturing plant. The factory will manufacture firearms for the Indian army. IWI said in 2017, that it expects tenders with the Indian army in the region of $200–300 million.

==== USA ====
IWI also operates a manufacturing facility in Middletown, Pennsylvania USA. They locally assemble the Zion-15, Tavor and Galil rifles, TS12 15+1 round semi-automatic shotgun as well as the Jericho, Masada and Galil pistols, among others.

==== Netherlands ====
IWI and the Dutch Artillerie Inrichtingen Armaments (AIA) company signed an agreement to manufacture defense systems in the Netherlands.

== Products ==
Name	Type	Year	Image
ARAD	Assault rifle	2019	
ARAD 7	Battle rifle, Designated marksman rifle	>2019	
Carmel	Assault rifle, Semi-automatic rifle	2019	
Dan	Sniper rifle	2014	
Desert Eagle	Semi-automatic pistol	1982	
Dror	Light machine gun	1946	
Galil	Assault rifle	1972	
Galil ACE	Assault rifle	2008	
Jericho 941	Semi-automatic pistol	1990	
MAPATS	Anti-tank guided missile	1984	
Masada	Semi-automatic pistol	2017	
Negev	Light machine gun	1985	
Negev NG7	General-purpose light machine gun	2012	
SP-21 Barak	Semi-automatic pistol	2002	
Tavor 7	Bullpup battle rifle	2017	
Tavor TAR-21	Bullpup assault rifle	2001	
Tavor TS12	Bullpup semi-automatic shotgun	2018	
Tavor X95	Bullpup assault rifle	2009	
Tavor X95 SMG	Bullpup submachine gun		
Uzi	Submachine gun	1950	
Zion-15	AR-15-style rifle	2020	

== Security training ==
IWI offers anti-terrorism training to Israeli citizens and contracts its services to outside countries requiring security training and anti-terror training to protect assets and high-ranking officials. IWI collaborates with the Metropolitan College of New York (MCNY) in New York City, which offers a classroom-based MA degree in Public Administration, Emergency Management, and Homeland Security.

== See also ==
- Defense industry of Israel
- Military equipment of Israel
- List of modern armament manufacturers
- Israel's arms supplier countries
- IMI Systems
