= IWI Tavor X95 =

Israeli bullpup assault rifle

IWI X95
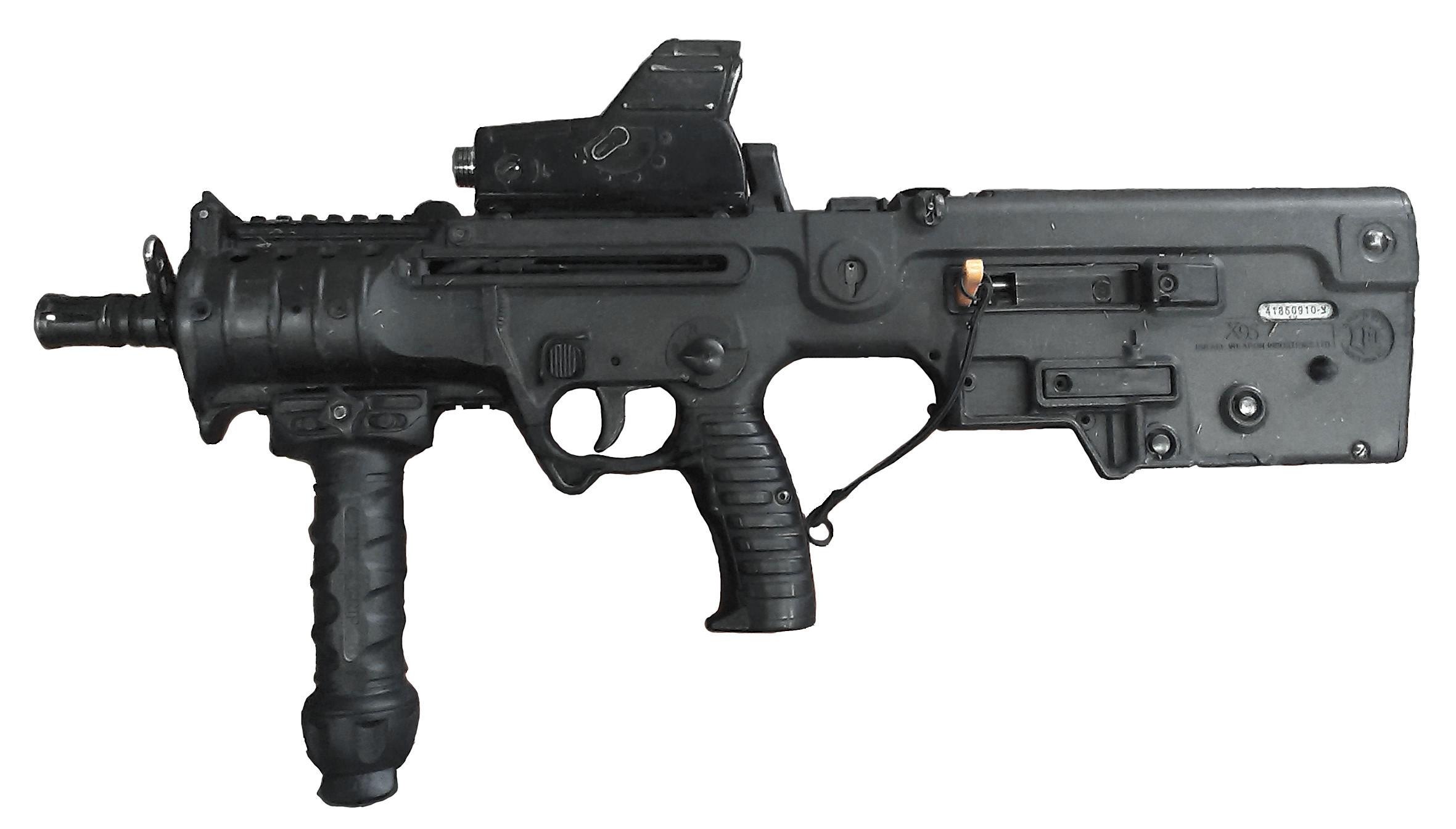
- X95 (SMG variant) with a MARS reflex sight fitted
- Type: Bullpup assault rifle Carbine
- Place of origin: Israel

Service history
- In service: 2009–present
- Used by: See Users
- Wars: Gaza–Israel conflict Russo-Ukrainian War; 2025 Cambodia-Thailand conflict

Production history
- Designer: Israel Weapon Industries
- Designed: 2003–2009
- Manufacturer: Israel Weapon Industries (IWI); Also produced under IWI license by: PLR Systems, India; RPC Fort
- Variants: See Variants

Specifications
- Mass: 3.3–3.62 kg (7.3–8.0 lb)
- Length: 580–714 mm (22.8–28.1 in)
- Barrel length: 330 mm (13.0 in); 380 mm (15.0 in); 419 mm (16.5 in)
- Cartridge: 5.56×45mm NATO.300 AAC Blackout; 5.45×39mm
- Action: Long-stroke gas-operated, rotating bolt
- Rate of fire: 750–950 rounds/min
- Feed system: STANAG magazines (5.56mm NATO, 5.45x39 & .300 Blackout)
- Sights: Iron sights or Picatinny rail for optics

The IWI X95 (formerly known as the Micro-Tavor, MTAR or MTAR-21) is an Israeli bullpup assault rifle designed and produced by Israel Weapon Industries (IWI) as part of the Tavor rifle family, along with the Tavor TAR and the Tavor 7.

== History ==
In November 2009, the X95 was selected as the future standard-issue weapon of the Israeli infantry.

Following the use of the weapon by Indian forces fighting the insurgency in Kashmir, CRPF commanders have stated that the X95 is a more effective assault rifle than the AKM, due to its small size, power, longer range and lighter weight.

In 2014, the IDF announced that in the future (from as early as the end of 2014) some infantry units could start to be issued some numbers of an improved X95, which will have a longer 380 mm (15.0 in) barrel, instead of the original 330 mm (13.0 in) barrel of the X95, and a lighter trigger pull. In September 2021, it was reported that Israeli front-line infantry units have begun replacing their Tavor and Micro Tavor Rifles with M4s and that the Micro Tavor Rifles in existing inventory will be transitioned to reserve brigades.

On 7 September 2021, a report was published on the IDF's Hebrew website that the IDF plans to continue acquiring the Micro Tavor and equipping combat units with it.

== Design ==
The X95 can be easily distinguished from the TAR-21 (as well as from the CTAR-21, STAR-21, and GTAR-21) by the location of its charging handle.

The X95's charging handle is closer to the pistol grip, whilst the TAR-21's charging handle is closer to its muzzle. It also features a redesigned buttstock and a magazine release near the pistol grip.

Compared to the 890 mm (35 in) long M4 carbine (with its stock extended) with a 368 mm (14.5 in) barrel, the X95 is 580 mm (22.8 in), 640 mm (25.2 in), or 670 mm (26.4 in) long, with either a 330 mm (13 in), 380 mm (15 in), or a 419 mm (16.5 in) barrel, respectively.

=== Action ===
As of Spring 2020, all new 5.56×45mm NATO production X95's were upgraded with the .300 AAC Blackout recoil mechanism.

=== Conversion ===
With the use of a relatively simple conversion kit, the X95 can be converted from a 5.56mm assault rifle to a 9mm submachine gun.

A suppressor can also be attached, as part of the 9mm conversion kit, or as part of a replacement handguard which integrates the muzzle brake, suppressor, and handguard.

When configured in 9mm, the X95 uses a blowback system to cycle through the ammunition, whilst using the same body as the gas-operated rifle system. It uses Colt 9mm SMG magazines. The barrel is of the same length as of the rifle configuration, but has a 1:10 in rifling twist to stabilise the heavy 9mm round.

Visual differences between the TAR-21 and X95

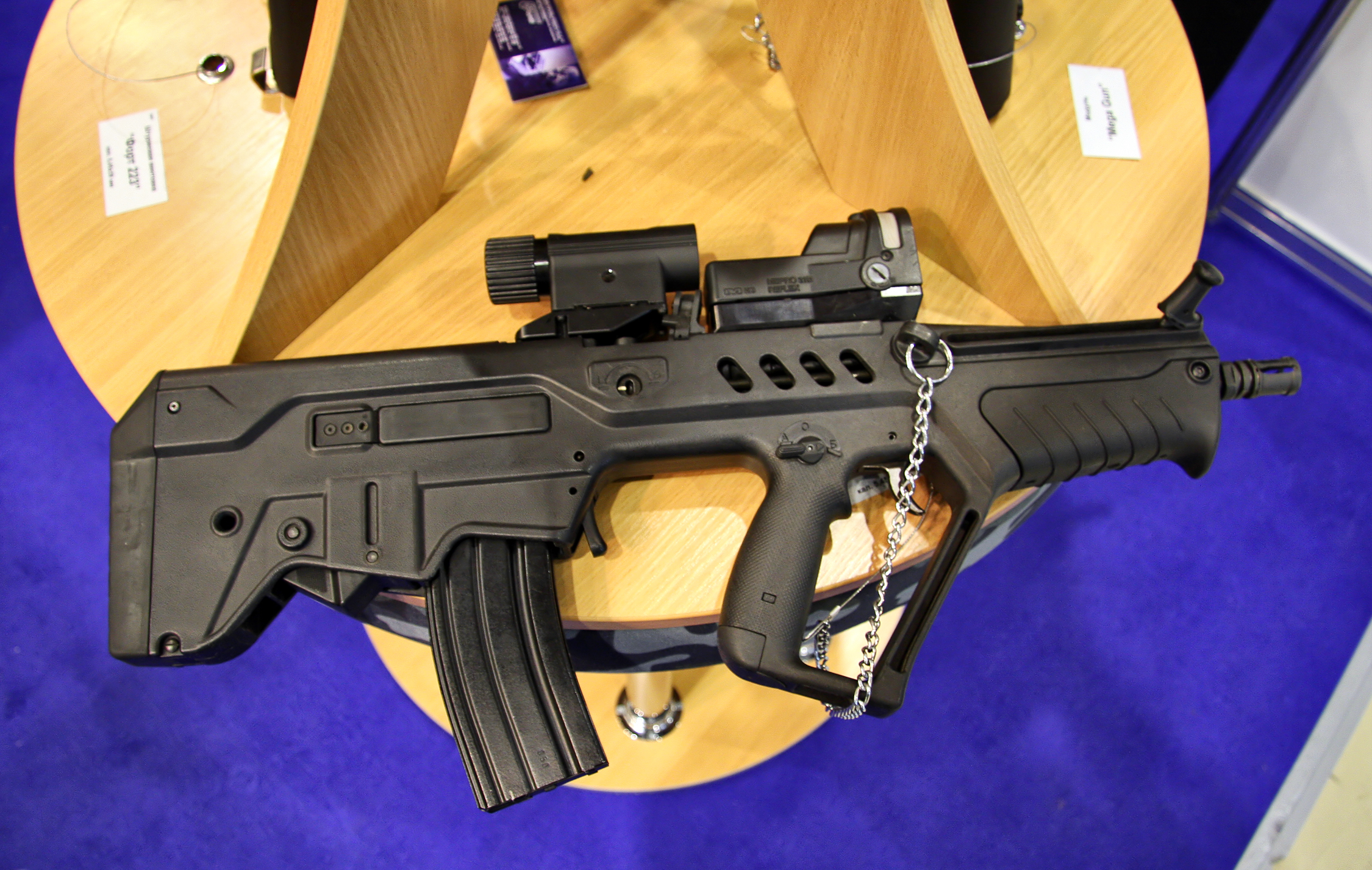
Notice the charging handle position, the handguard, and the buttstock form and size of the CTAR-21

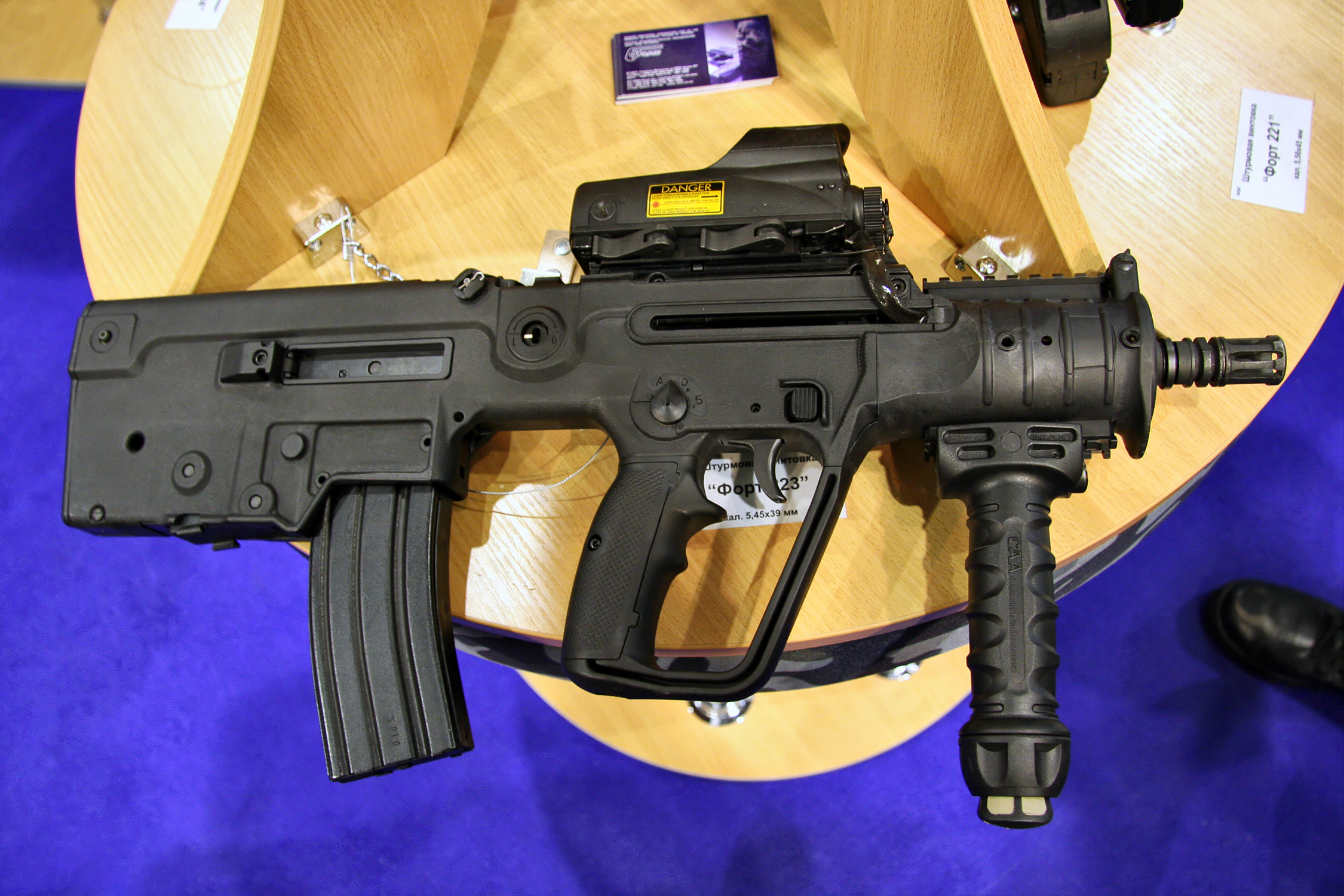
Notice the charging handle position, the Picatinny rail, and the buttstock form and size of the X95 equipped with a tactical handle monopod

=== Accessories ===
The X95 has its own underslung grenade launcher, the X95 GL 40. A discontinued production model of the X95, the X95-GL had the capability to mount an M203 grenade launcher on an extended notched barrel.

There are three different handguards currently available for the X95:

1. the first being rounded so it can mount the suppressor inside of the handguard, and is currently only available for military issue
2. the second is a rectangular one with integrated rails at the 3, 6 and 9 o'clock positions, and has removable rail covers
3. the third is an elongated version of the second, made for IWI US Tavor X95s.

The rounded handguard originally had separate picatinny rails on the receiver and handguard, but IWI has produced a full-length flattop rail and an underside rail for it; the other two handguards have integrated flattop rails.

The X95 comes with the option of changing out the pistol grip with either the standard Tavor Talon trigger guard, a traditional trigger guard, or any compatible third-party accessory.

== Variants ==
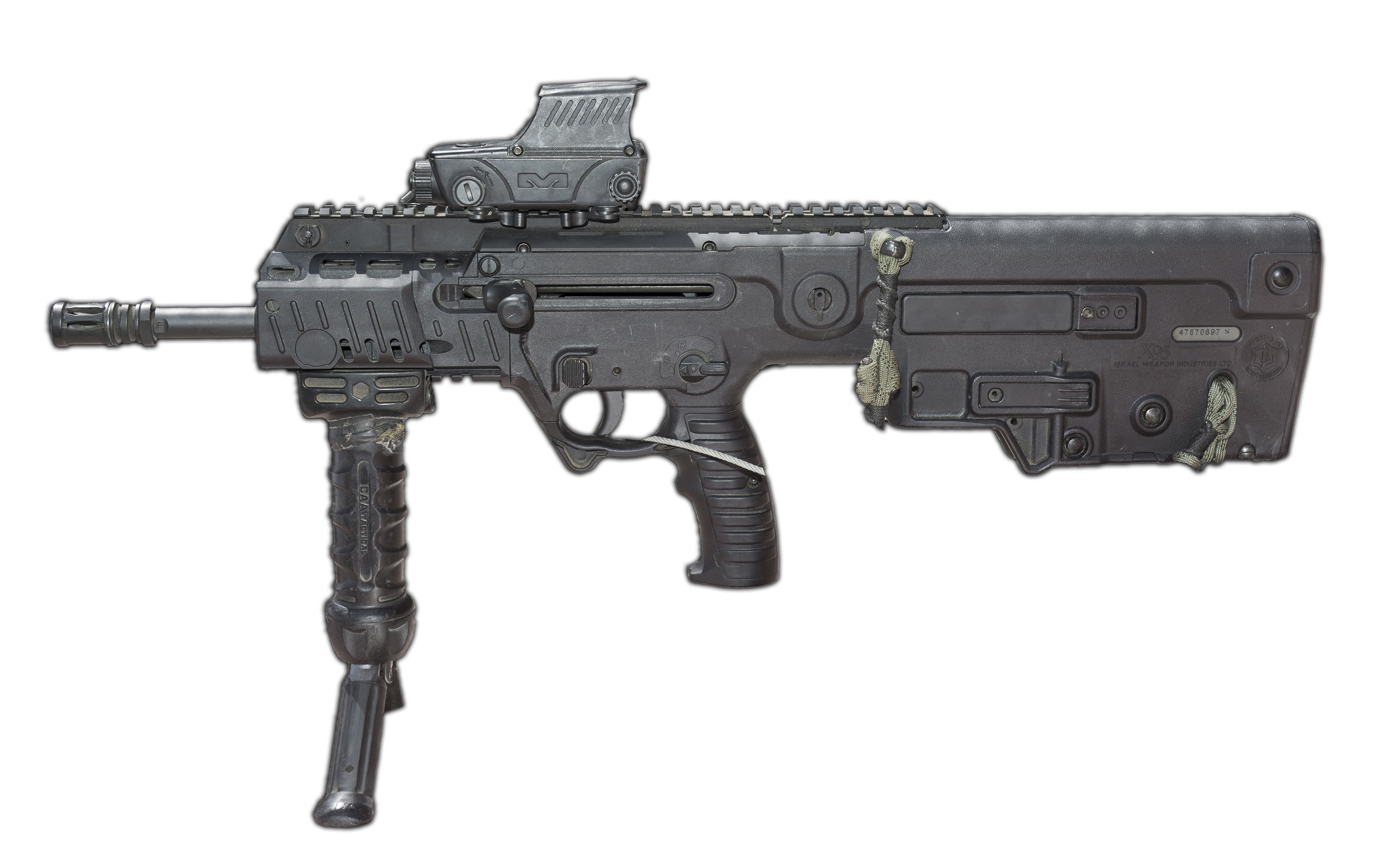
A left-side view of the X95 flattop 380 of the Israel Defense Forces

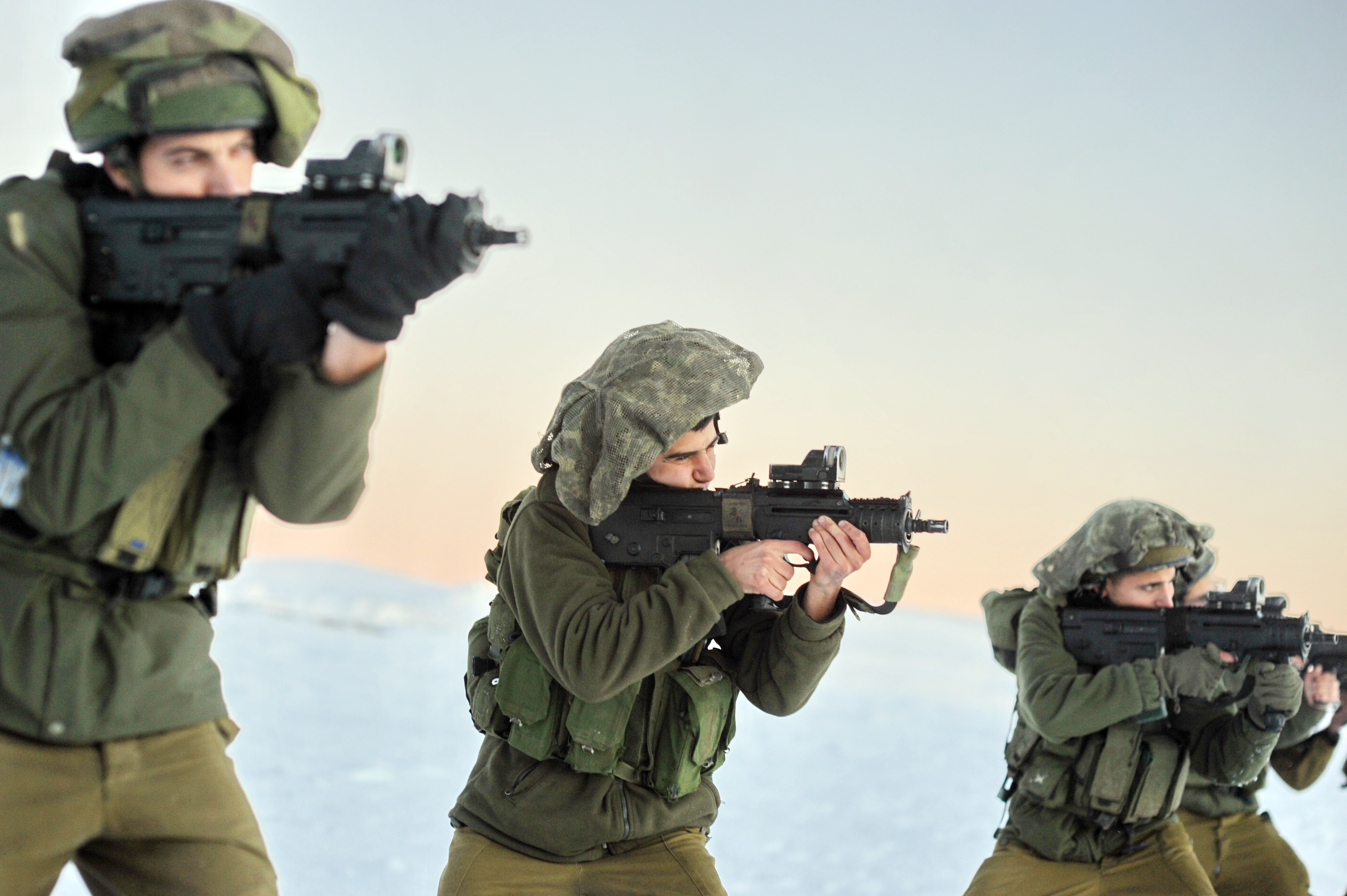
IDF soldiers with the X95 on Mount Hermon

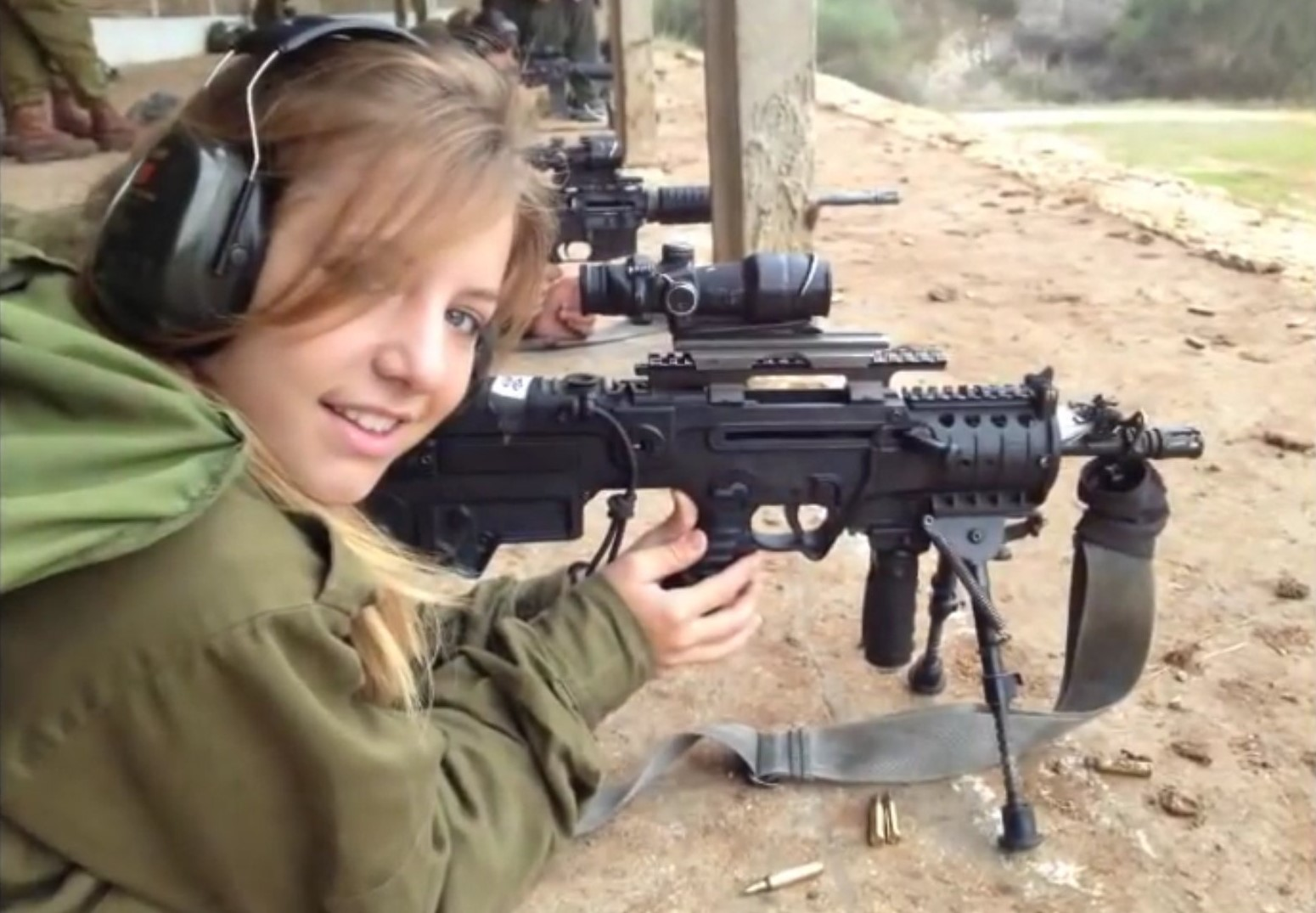
X95-L used during a Warrant Officer course in the Israel Defense Forces

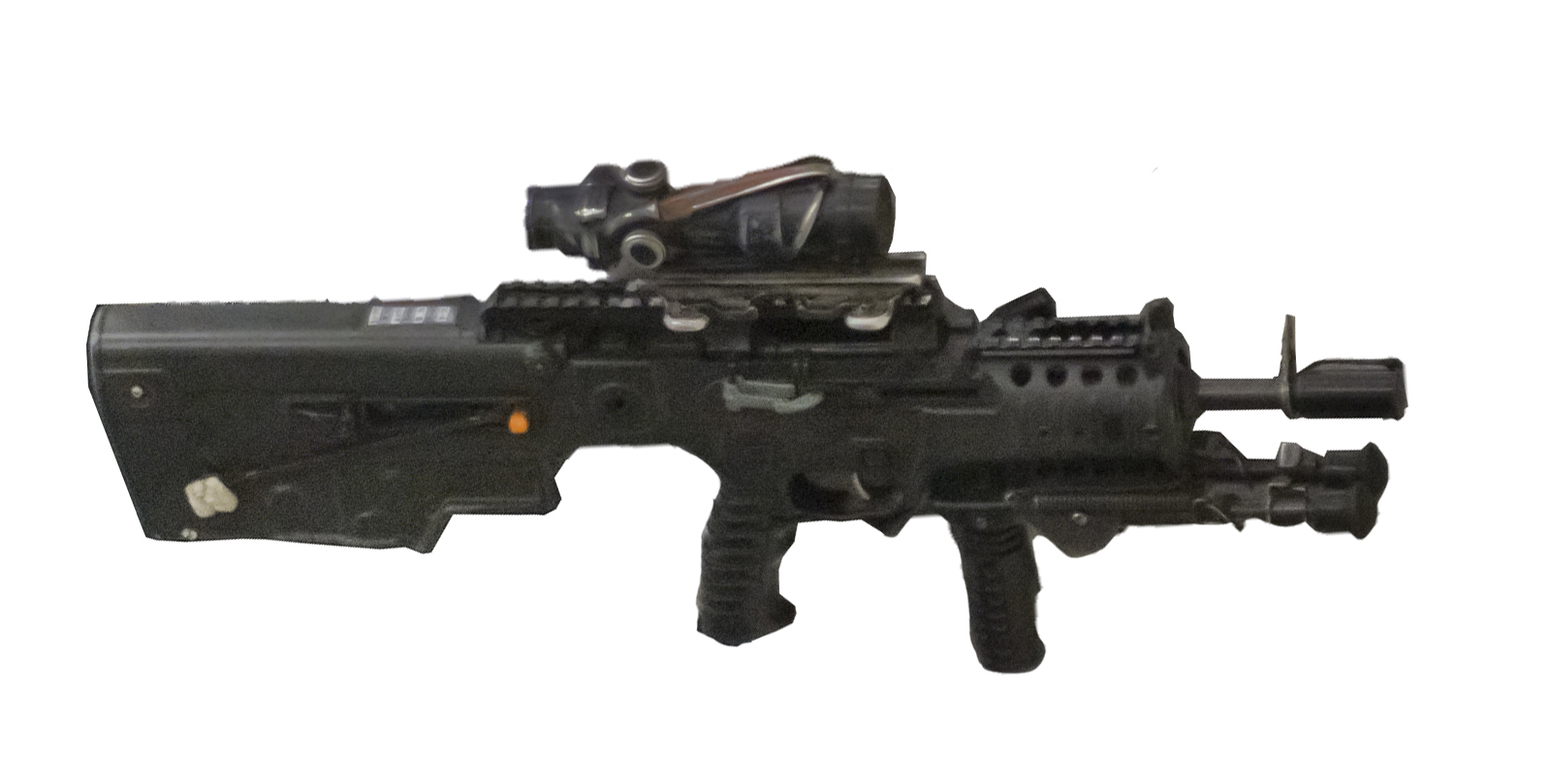
A right-side view of the X95-L

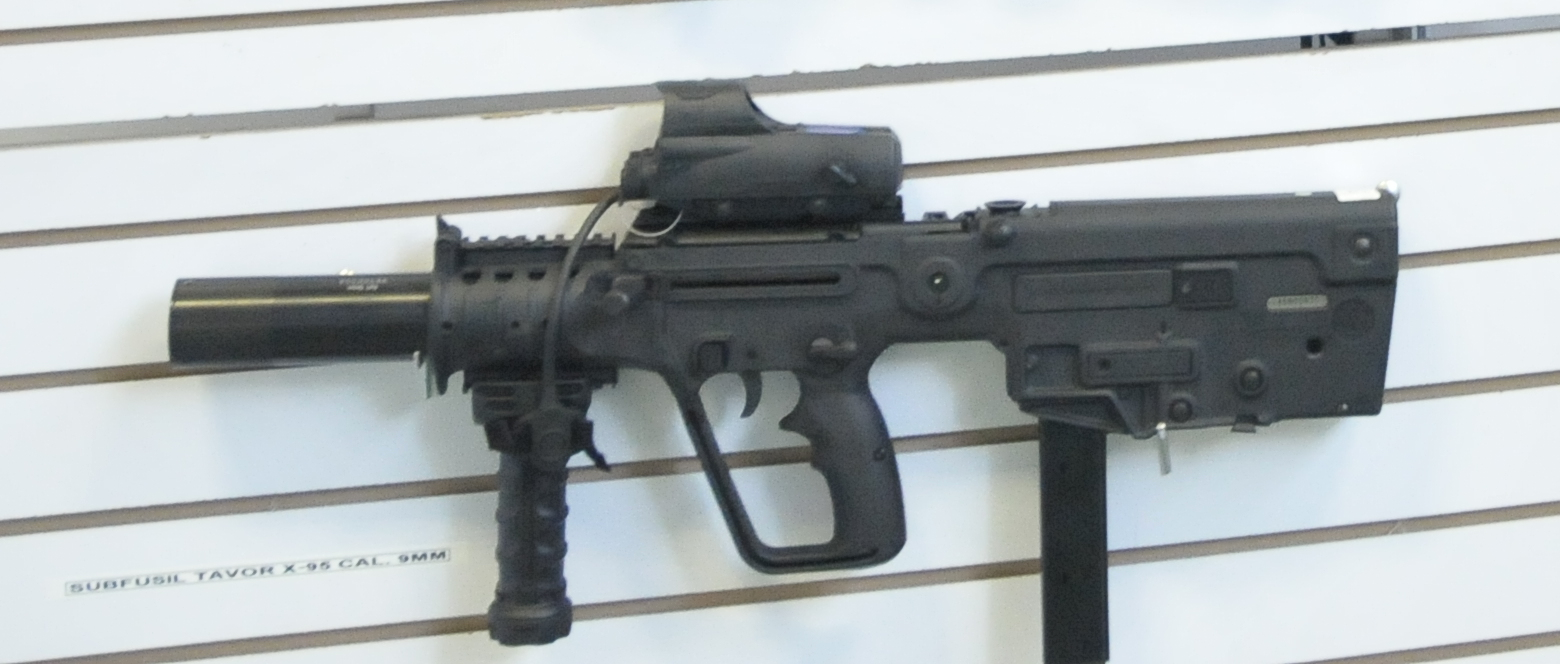
A left-side view of the X95-S SMG

The X95 comes in a number of variants (including):

=== X95 ===
The X95 is chambered in either 5.56×45mm NATO or .300 AAC Blackout. The .300 BLK configuration features a gas regulator for both supersonic and subsonic loads.

Variant	Configuration	Barrel length	Overall length	Notes
X95 330	Carbine	330 mm (13 in)	580 mm (22.8 in)	
X95 380	Assault rifle	380 mm (15 in)	640 mm (25.2 in)	Out of production and replaced by the X95 419
X95 419	Assault rifle	419 mm (16.5 in)	670 mm (26.4 in)	
X95-L	Semi-automatic rifle	419 mm (16.5 in)		Semi-automatic only X95 variant intended. It features a integrated bipod and is issued with a long-range sight.
X95-GL	X95 variant with the ability to mount a M203 grenade launcher on its longer notched barrel. It has since been superseded by the IWI GL 40 grenade launcher, which can be mounted on the current standard flattop X95 without the need for modifications or additional tools.			

=== X95-R ===
The X95-R is chambered in 5.45×39mm and can easily be rechambered to the three other calibres that IWI offers:

Variant	Configuration	Barrel length	Overall length
X95-R 330	Carbine	330 mm (13 in)	580 mm (22.8 in)
X95-R 419	Assault rifle	419 mm (16.5 in)	670 mm (26.4 in)

=== X95 SMG ===
The X95 SMG is chambered in 9×19mm Parabellum and is also available as a conversion kit.

Variant	Configuration	Barrel length	Overall length
X95 SMG	Submachine gun	279 mm (11.0 in)	580 mm (22.8 in)
X95-S SMG	Submachine gun	279 mm (11.0 in)	650 mm (25.6 in)

=== Licensed variants ===
Variant	Origin	Manufacturer	Description	Reference
Fort-223	Ukraine	RPC Fort	Ukrainian X95-330 variant, readily converted to the X95 SMG or X95-S SMG	
Fort-224	Ukraine	RPC Fort	Ukrainian X95R-330 variant, readily converted to the X95 SMG or X95-S SMG	
Zittara	India	Ordnance Factory Board	Indian licensed-built Micro Tavor variant, never mass produced. Would be chambered in 5.56×30mm MINSAS, 5.56 NATO and 9x19mm.	

=== Civilian variants ===
==== IWI US ====
IWI US offers the rifle in semi-automatic only configuration as the 'Tavor X95'.

All Tavor X95s sold on the U.S. civilian market are semi-automatic only and come with an elongated handguard and a thicker buttpad to comply with the firearm laws of the U.S.

IWI US retails the Tavor X95s in a variety of colours, including Black (B), Flat Dark Earth (FD), and OD Green (G); the letter "B" in the rifles designations can be switched with any of the other colour letters.

==== IWI Canada ====
Variant	Configuration	Calibre	Notes
XB13SBR	Assault rifle	5.56×45mm NATO	U.S. version of the X95 419, 579 mm (22.8 in) in length
XB16	Assault rifle	5.56×45mm NATO	U.S. version of the X95 419, 664 mm (26.1 in) in length
XB16L	Assault rifle	5.56×45mm NATO	XB16 with left-handed controls pre-installed
XB18	Assault rifle	5.56×45mm NATO	With a 18.5 in (470 mm) barrel and a 28.125 in (714.4 mm) overall length
XB18RS	Assault rifle	5.56×45mm NATO	With an 18.5 in (470 mm) barrel and a 30.5 in (770 mm) overall length; integrated permanent muzzle brake and a 10-round magazine to be compliant with laws of certain states; "RS" stands for Restricted State.
XB16-BLK	Assault rifle	.300 AAC Blackout	XB16 .300 AAC Blackout variant
XB17-9	Carbine	9×19mm Parabellum	With a 17 in (430 mm) barrel and a 26.125 in (663.6 mm) overall length

All Tavor X95s sold on the Canadian civilian market are semi-automatic only and come in both "Restricted" and "Non-restricted" classifications.

The "Restricted" models have a 13.0 in (330 mm) barrel and were made available starting 2021. They are only available as used, Israeli surplus firearms, and come with either square or circular handguards.

The "Non-restricted" models have a 18.6 in (470 mm) barrel with an overall length of 28.4 in (720 mm) and are available as new or surplus.

== Users ==
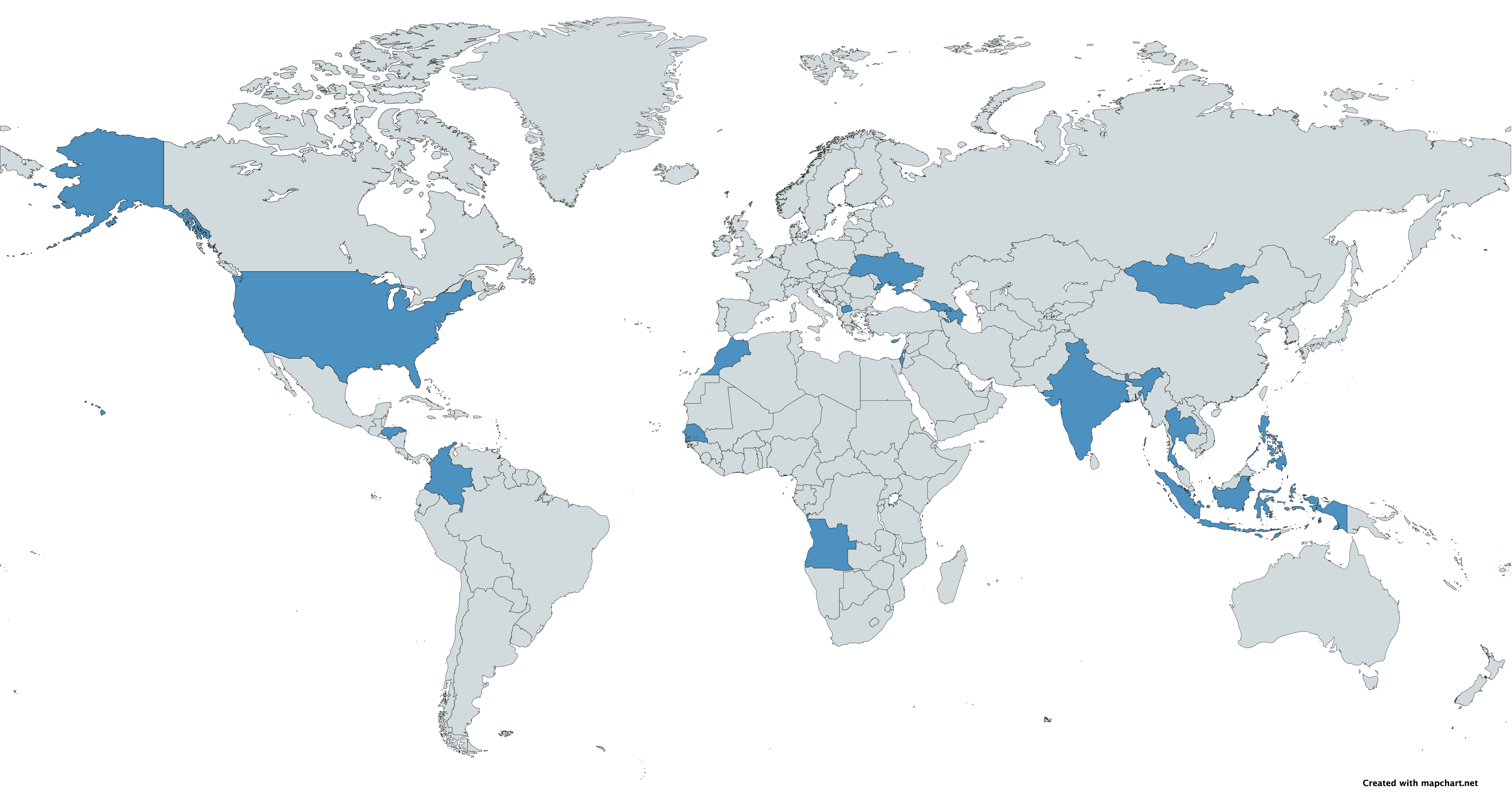
A map with IWI Tavor X95 users in blue

Israeli soldiers armed with X95s

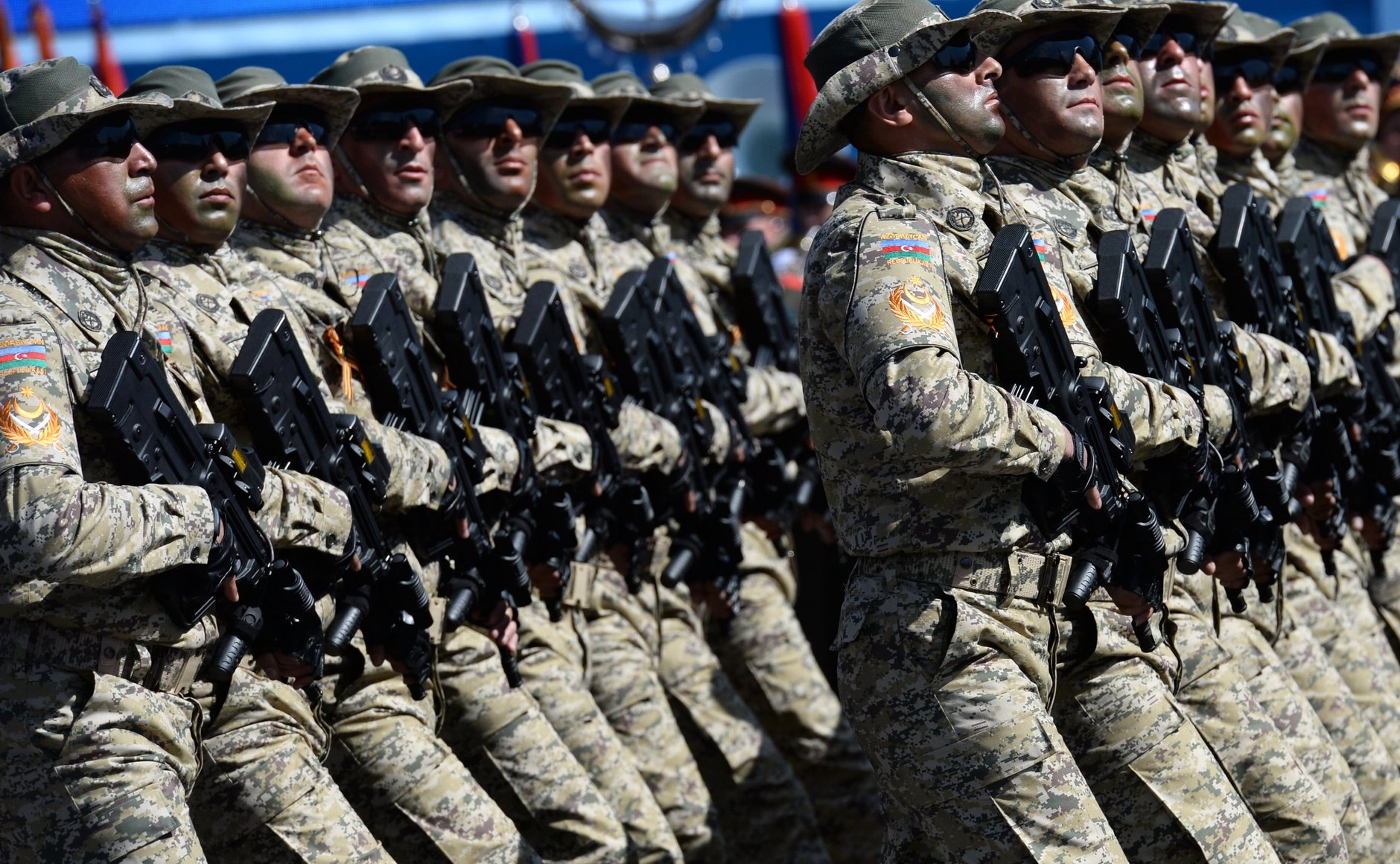
Contingent from the Azerbaijani military armed with X95s during the Moscow Victory Day Parade, 2015

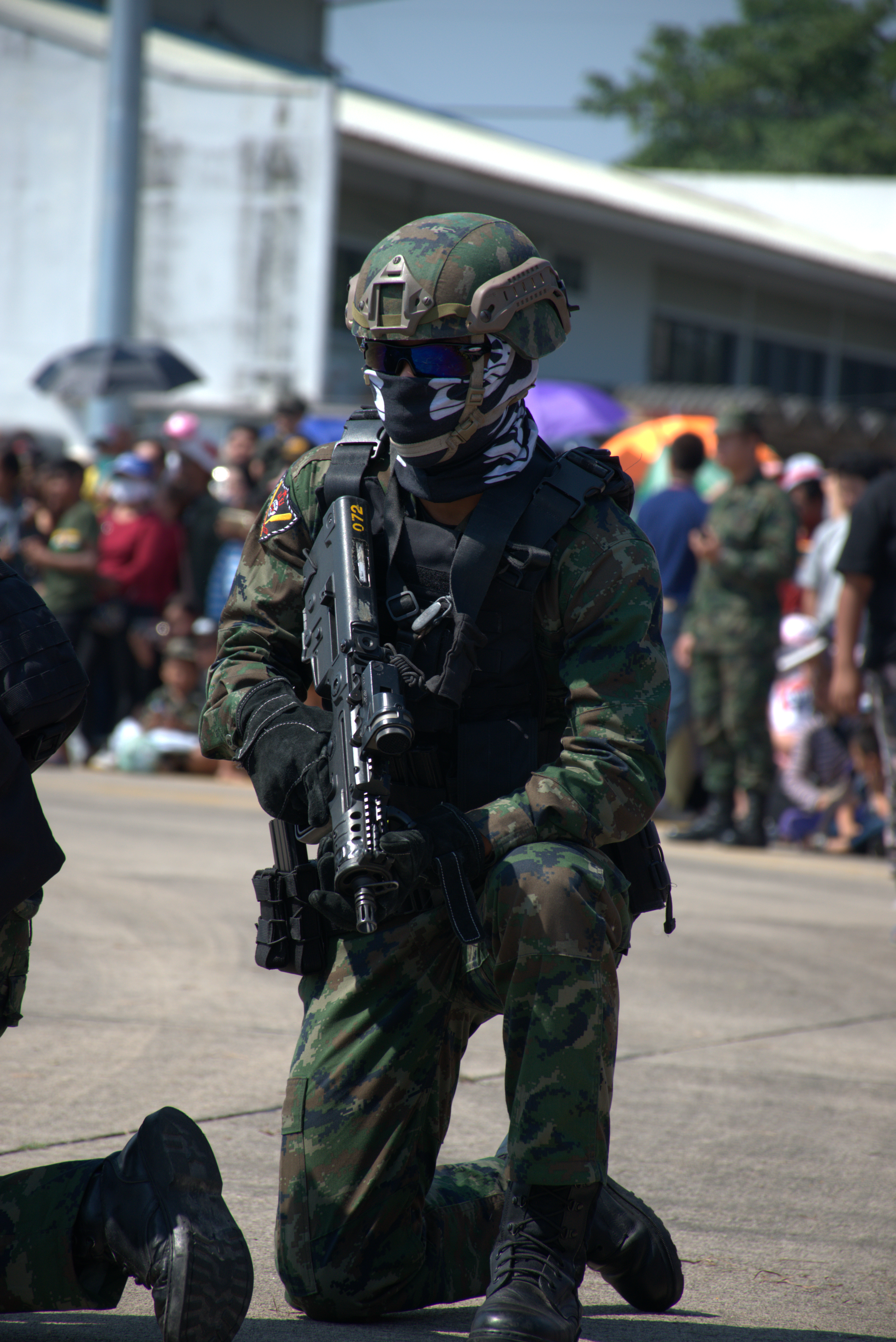
Royal Thai Marine Corp Recon Battalion operator armed with an X95 at Thailand Children's Day 2018

- Angola: The Angolan Armed Forces use the X95.
- Argentina: Tucuman Provincial Police and Argentine Naval Prefecture.
- Azerbaijan: State Border Service (Azerbaijan) and Marine Infantry of Azerbaijan uses the X95.
- Colombia: The National Police of Colombia uses the X95.
- Cyprus: The Χ95 is used by the Cypriot Special Forces.
- Georgia: Used mostly by security services and protection details.
- Honduras: The Honduran Army uses the X95.
- India: India's Central Reserve Police Force (CRPF) ordered 12,000 X95 rifles which entered service in early 2011. Following the use of the weapon by Indian forces fighting the insurgency in Kashmir, CRPF commanders have stated that the X95 is a more effective assault rifle than the AKM, due to its small size, power, longer range and lighter weight. In late 2002, India signed an ₹880 million (equivalent to ₹3.7 billion or US$38 million in 2026) deal with Israel Military Industries for 3,070 manufactured TAR-21s to be issued to India's special forces personnel, where its ergonomics, reliability in heat and sand might give them an edge at close-quarters and employment from inside vehicles. This works out to a price of ₹286,645 (equivalent to ₹1.2 million or US$12,000 in 2026) per rifle. The new Tavor X95s have a modified single-piece stock and new sights, as well as Turkish-made MKEK T-40 40mm under-barrel grenade launchers. 5,500 have been recently inducted and more rifles are being ordered.
- Indonesia: Used by Indonesian Air Force Infantry Special Forces Kopasgat.
- Israel: In November 2009, the IDF announced that the X95 would become the standard infantry weapon of the IDF, with the addition of an integrated grenade-launcher. In 2014, the IDF announced that in the future (from as early as the end of 2014) some infantry units could start to be issued some numbers of an improved X95, which will have a longer 380 mm (15.0 in) barrel, instead of the original 330 mm (13.0 in) barrel of the X95, and a lighter trigger pull.
- Morocco: The DGSN has used the X95 since 2018.
- North Macedonia: Used by the Special Anti-terrorist Unit - Tiger.
- Philippines: The Philippine Coast Guard and the Philippine National Police uses the X95.
- Senegal
- Thailand
- Ukraine: RPC Fort offers the X95 330 as the Fort-223, and the X95-R as the Fort-224. The Fort-224 is in service of the National Guard of Ukraine.
- United States: The Pennsylvania Capitol Police uses the X95.
