= IWI Tavor TS12 =

Israeli semi-automatic bullpup shotgun

Tavor TS12
- Type: Semi-automatic bullpup shotgun
- Place of origin: Israel

Production history
- Unit cost: $1,399
- Produced: 2018 - present

Specifications
- Mass: Empty: 8 lb (3.6 kg)
- Length: 28.34 in (720 mm)
- Barrel length: 18.5 in (470 mm)
- Height: 10.23 in (260 mm)
- Action: Short stroke gas piston
- Rate of fire: 123 rounds/min
- Muzzle velocity: 335 m/s (1,100 ft/s)
- Effective firing range: 123 m (135 yd)
- Feed system: 3 magazine tubes; 5 shells each

The IWI Tavor TS12 is an Israeli semi-automatic bullpup shotgun, based on the IWI Tavor assault rifle. The Tavor TS12 is designed and produced by Israel Weapon Industries (IWI). The TS12 was the best selling semi-automatic shotgun on GunBroker.com in 2020.

== History ==
In January 2018, the TS12, which was the first bullpup shotgun developed by IWI, was revealed at SHOT Show, and released on the market the same year.

== Design ==
TS12 shells are loaded into three magazine tubes, each holding five shells, for a maximum of 15 + 1 shells. The tubes can be rotated via a button on the pistol grip.

The TS12 has a Picatinny rail, with receptacles on both the left and right.
