= SP-21 Barak =

- Type: Semi-automatic pistol
- Place of origin: Israel

Production history
- Manufacturer: Israel Weapon Industries
- Produced: 2002–present

Specifications
- Mass: 29.1 oz.
- Length: 7.5 in.
- Barrel length: 3.9 in.
- Cartridge: 9×19mm Parabellum; .40 S&W; .45 ACP
- Action: Short recoil
- Feed system: 15 (9×19mm); 12 (.40 S&W); 10 (.45 ACP) round detachable box magazine
- Sights: Fixed (Combat), 3-dot Tritium sights

The SP-21 Barak (Hebrew: ברק; lit. 'lightning') is a double action/single action semi-automatic, recoil-operated pistol developed and produced by Israel Weapon Industries in 2002.

The gun was made to suit both self-defense and law enforcement needs.

== Design ==
The SP-21 Barak is made of polymer and its grip has integrated polymer. It has a frame-mounted thumb safety.

== Export ==
The Israeli-made weapon was marketed to Europe and United States in 2003. The gun's suggested retail price is US$499.
