= IWI Tavor =

IWI Tavor TAR-21
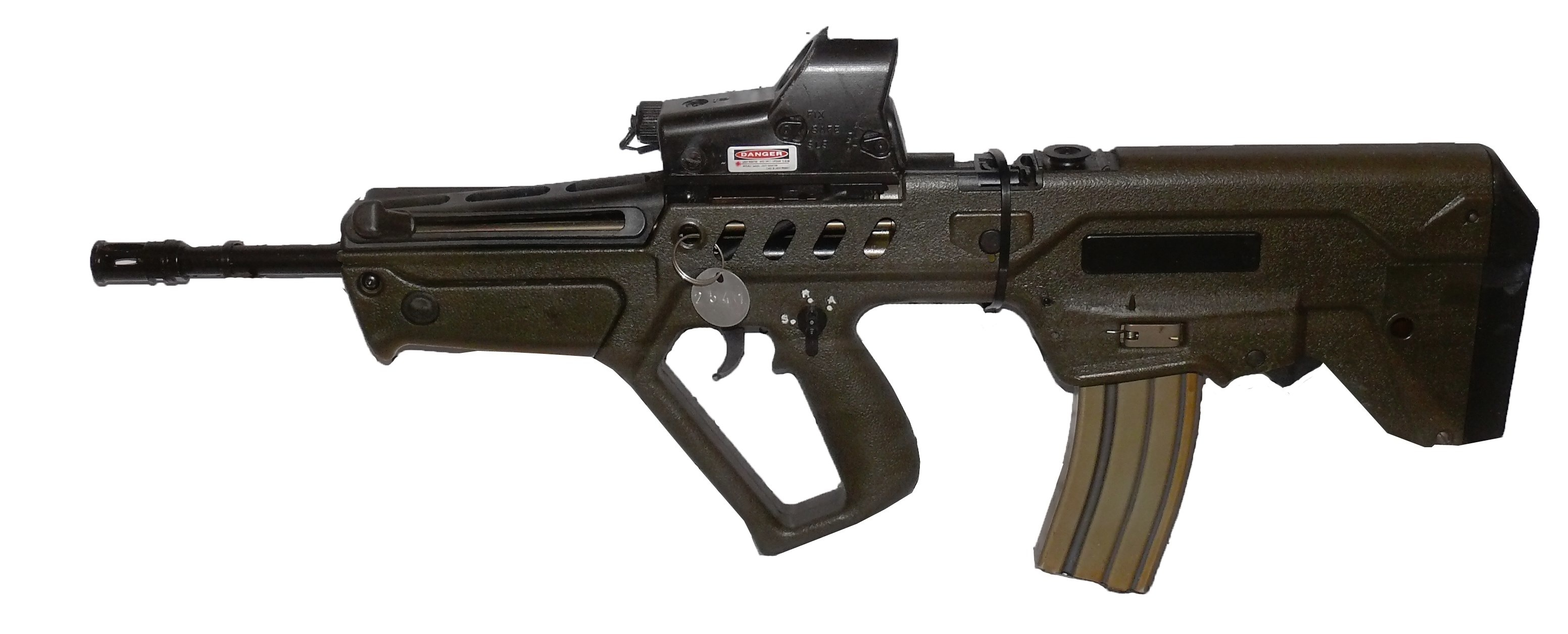
- Tavor TAR-21 with MARS sight in the Israel Defense Forces History Museum
- Type: Bullpup assault rifle
- Place of origin: Israel

Service history
- In service: 2001–present
- Used by: See Users
- Wars: South Thailand insurgency; Gaza–Israel conflict; Gaza War (2008–2009); 2014 Israel–Gaza conflict; Gaza war; Insurgency in Jammu and Kashmir; Second Nagorno-Karabakh war; Colombian conflict; Russo-Ukrainian War; Russian invasion of Ukraine

Production history
- Designer: Israel Military Industries
- Designed: 1995–2003
- Manufacturer: Israel Weapon Industries; Also produced under IWI license by: PLR Systems, India; RPC Fort (of Ukraine)
- Variants: See Variants

Specifications
- Mass: 3.27 kg (7.21 lb)
- Length: 720 mm (28.3 in)
- Barrel length: 457 mm (18 in) (Tavor TAR)
- Cartridge: 5.56×45mm NATO
- Action: Long-stroke gas-operated, closed rotating bolt
- Rate of fire: 750–950 rounds/min
- Muzzle velocity: 910 m/s (2,986 ft/s)
- Effective firing range: 550 m (1,804 ft)
- Feed system: 30-round detachable box STANAG magazine (5.56×45mm NATO)
- Sights: Backup iron sights and integrated Picatinny rails are provided for the Meprolight MP 21, ITL MARS with integrated laser and IR pointer, Trijicon ACOG, EOTech holographic sight, and other optical sights

The IWI Tavor, previously designated as the Tavor TAR-21 (Tavor Assault Rifle – 21st century), is an Israeli bullpup assault rifle chambered in 5.56×45mm NATO, designed and produced by Israel Weapon Industries (IWI). It is part of the Tavor family of rifles, which have spawned many derivatives of the original design.

The Tavor TAR-21 can also be mounted with the M203 grenade launcher, designated as the GTAR-21. A compact variant with a 380 mm (15 in) barrel is also available, designated as the CTAR-21. A designated marksman rifle variant with a folding under-barrel bipod and Trijicon ACOG 4× magnification sight was also made but later phased out in favour for the Tavor TAR Flattop.

Built around a long-stroke piston system (as found in the M1 Garand and AK-47), the Tavor is designed to maximise reliability, durability, simplicity of design, and ease of maintenance, particularly under adverse battlefield conditions.

In 2009, the Tavor X95 (also known as the Micro Tavor or MTAR) was selected by the Israel Defense Forces to gradually replace the M16 assault rifle and M4 carbine variants as the standard-issued weapon of the Israeli infantry by the end of 2018. The first X95 bullpup rifles were issued to infantry units in 2013. A report published on the IDF's website revealed the IDF plans to continue acquiring the Micro Tavor and equipping combat units with it.

== History ==
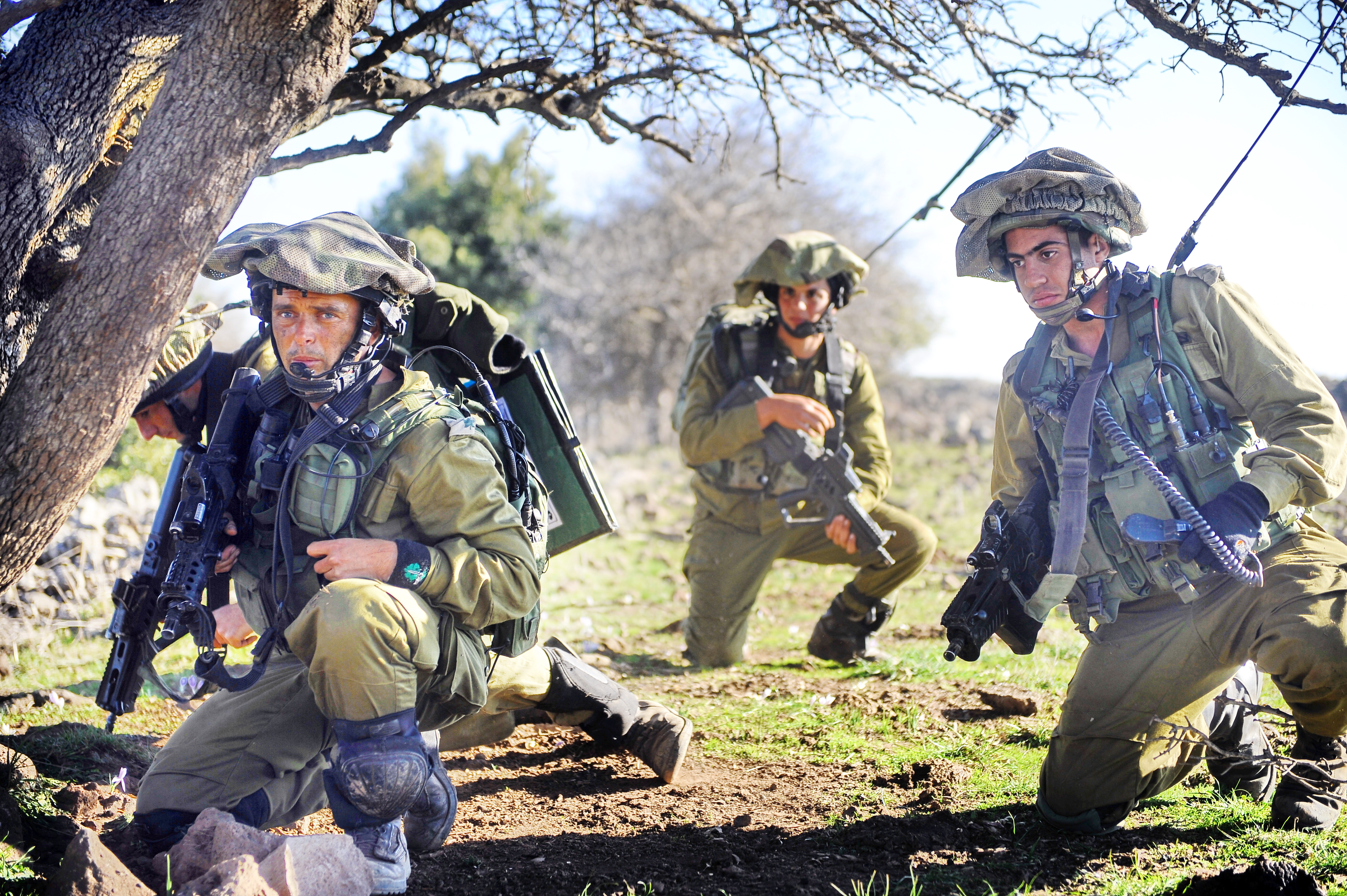
Tavor (X95 and CTAR-21 variants) in use with Israel's Golani Brigade

Israel Military Industries (the small arms branch of IMI was privatized into Israel Weapon Industries) initiated the Tavor development team in 1995, under the direction of designer Zalmen Shebs.

The objective of the project was to create an assault rifle that was more reliable, durable, and easier to maintain than the M4A1 carbine, while also being better suited to close-quarters combat and mechanized infantry roles. As a result, they hoped that the weapon would be officially adopted by the Israel Defense Forces.

Due to the military's close-quarters and mechanized infantry requirements, the project team selected a bullpup design that would allow the weapon to be compact while keeping a long barrel able to achieve ballistically favourable high muzzle velocities. A long-stroke piston system, similar to that found in the AK-47 and M1 Garand, was selected to ensure reliability.

=== Trials and service ===
By 1997, early prototypes were produced, with the Tavor prevailing over the M4A1 in a series of trials conducted during 2001 and 2002 by the Israel Defense Force. Qualities tested included Mean Rounds Between Failures (MRBF), reliability, ergonomics during long marches, and ease-of-maintenance.

As part of initial testing by Israel Defense Forces' infantry units, the TAR-21 was distributed to members of the training company of the Tzabar Battalion from the Givati Brigade who were drafted in August 2001. They received their rifles in November 2001 during basic training. Initial testing results were favourable – the TAR-21 was found to be significantly more accurate and reliable (as well as more comfortable) than the M4 during extensive field testing.

Issues with fine sand entering the Tavor TAR's chamber, which were identified over the two years of testing, were rectified by numerous small adjustments. A number of other improvements and changes to the design were also made between 2001 and 2009.

The Tavor CTAR-21 saw combat service in Operation Cast Lead, used by Givati Brigade and Golani Brigade, and the soldiers reported the Tavor bullpup assault rifles functioned flawlessly.

In November 2009, the IDF announced that the Tavor X95 would become the standard infantry weapon of the IDF, with the addition of an integrated grenade launcher. A gradual changeover has begun in 2006 and expected completion among front line troops was to be by the end of 2018.

In December 2012, the IDF announced that they would begin equipping and training their new reserve forces with the Tavor TAR-21.

The first Tavor X95s were issued to new recruits of a main IDF infantry brigade in 2013, replacing the M16. In 2014 the IDF announced that in the future (from as early as the end of 2014) some infantry units could start to be issued some numbers of an improved X95, which will have a longer 38 cm (15 in) barrel (instead of the original 33 cm barrel) and a lighter trigger pull.

On 8 September, the IsraelDefense website reported that the IDF plans to continue acquiring the Micro Tavor, quoting from a report posted on the IDF's Hebrew website on 7 September regarding a multi-year plan. The rifle is to be distributed to combat troops of relevant units in upcoming rounds of recruitment. The weapons division of the Ground Forces Command was quoted as saying that it's "very satisfied by its capabilities... the rifle performs very well and has proven itself."

== Design details ==
The Tavor is a bullpup assault rifle, capable of both semi-automatic fire and fully automatic fire. Due to its bullpup design the receiver, bolt carrier group, and magazine are placed behind the pistol grip. This shortens the firearm's overall length without sacrificing barrel length. As a result, the Tavor provides carbine overall length, yet can achieve rifle muzzle velocities if equipped with a rifle-length barrel.

=== Long-stroke piston system ===
The Tavor uses a non-lubricated long-stroke piston system, as found in the M1 Garand, IMI Galil, and the AK-47. Like in the AK-47, the long-stroke piston mechanism contributes to the extreme forcefulness of the TAR-21's extraction and chambering. The Tavor's attachment of the piston to a heavy bolt carrier, and the extension of the mainspring into the hollow stem of the bolt carrier, bears a familiar resemblance to the internal mechanism of the AK-47.

=== Ambidexterity and modularity ===
The Tavor has ejection ports on both sides of the rifle so it can easily be reconfigured for right or left-handed shooters. However, this process requires partial disassembly, so it cannot be quickly reconfigured while the rifle is in use. An issue related to this is the original plastic cover on the unused ejection can allow gas to escape during the course of fire. Due to the bullpup design, this vents right under the shooter's face, causing issues such as inhaling ejection gases and the fouling of glasses and face with ejection debris. The issue is exacerbated when the weapon is suppressed. This has been addressed by various non-factory solutions which increase sealing of the unused port.

Its ambidextrous fire mode selector above the pistol grip has a semi-automatic mode and a fully automatic mode. The Tavor features a self-contained, drop-in trigger group so that the trigger group can be changed or replaced without the use of additional tools.

=== Chambering, cartridges and ammunition feeding ===
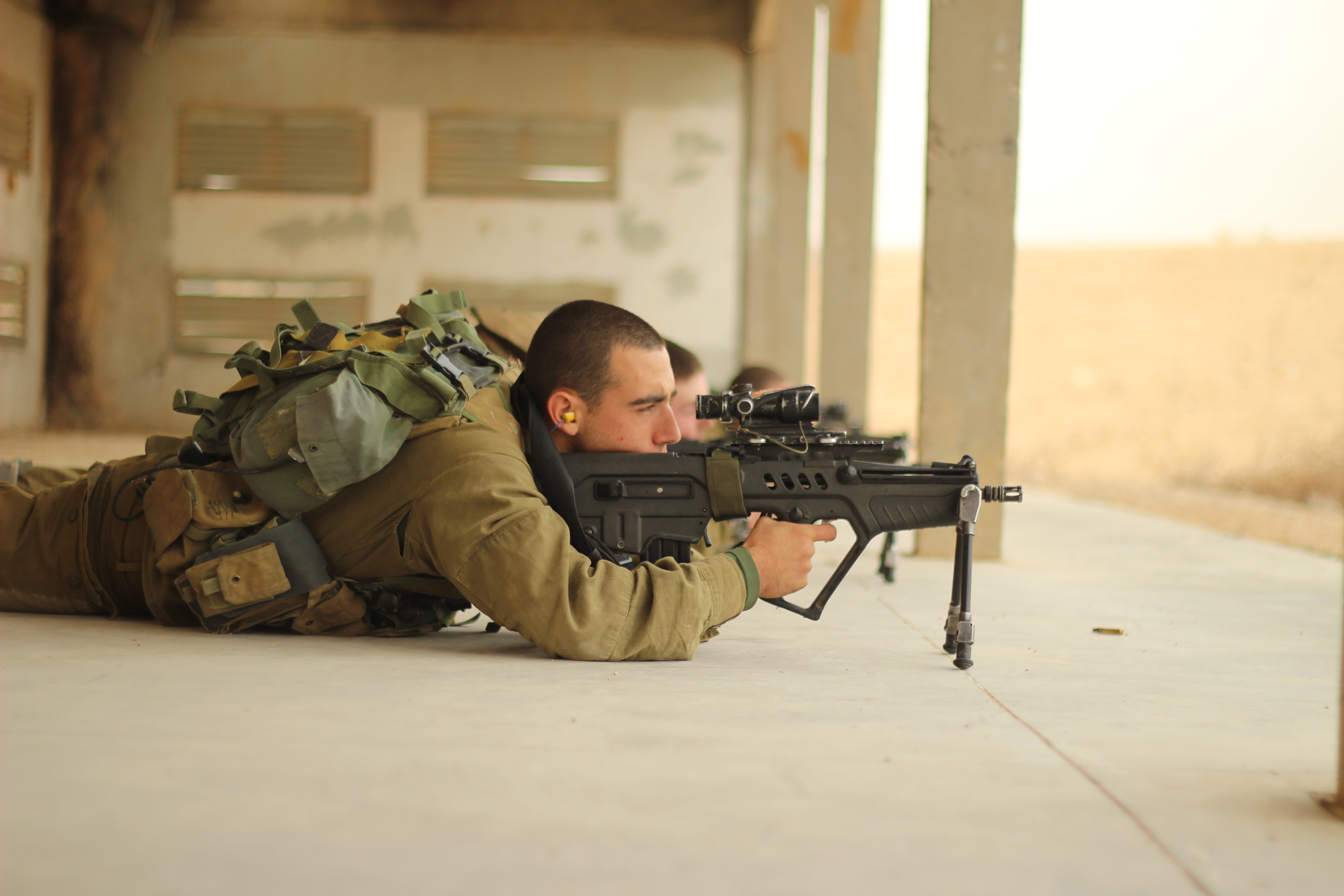
A Nahal soldier conducts firing drill with a CTAR-21

The Tavor is primarily chambered in 5.56×45mm NATO and uses STANAG magazines, conversion kits for 9×19mm Parabellum and 5.45×39mm calibre are also available.

The IDF uses both 3.6-gram (55 gr) M193 and 4.0-gram (62 gr) M855 5.56×45mm rounds. M193 rounds are used by regular infantrymen for better terminal effects at shorter distances, while the heavier M855 is used by sharpshooters.

=== Last round bolt-open catch ===
The Tavor features a last round bolt catch, whereby the bolt holds open after the last round discharges. This is a request of modern armies, as it helps to allow soldiers to know when their magazine empties and to reduce reloading times during combat while also not requiring manual action cycling after.

=== Barrel ===
The Tavor barrels are made from CrMoV steel and cold-hammer-forged (CHF) on the premises of the IWI factory in Ramat HaSharon. The TAR-21 barrel is 18 inches (457 mm) in length and is chrome-lined for durability and corrosion resistance. The barrel features six grooves in a one in seven inch (178 mm) twist, or 32 calibres right hand twist rate.

The barrel is fitted with a 'birdcage' style flash suppressor, which can be fully disassembled without the need for additional tools.

=== Reliability, ease-of-maintenance and waterproofing ===
The design objectives of the Tavor aimed for reliability and ease-of-maintenance, particularly under adverse or battlefield conditions. According to Russell C. Tilstra, the Tavor is "easily considered more reliable" than the M16 and M4 series rifles.

The Tavor is designed to be easily field-stripped, without the need for any additional tools.

It is waterproofed and its internal mechanism is sealed from outside elements, so that it can pass over-the-beach requirements.

== Variants ==
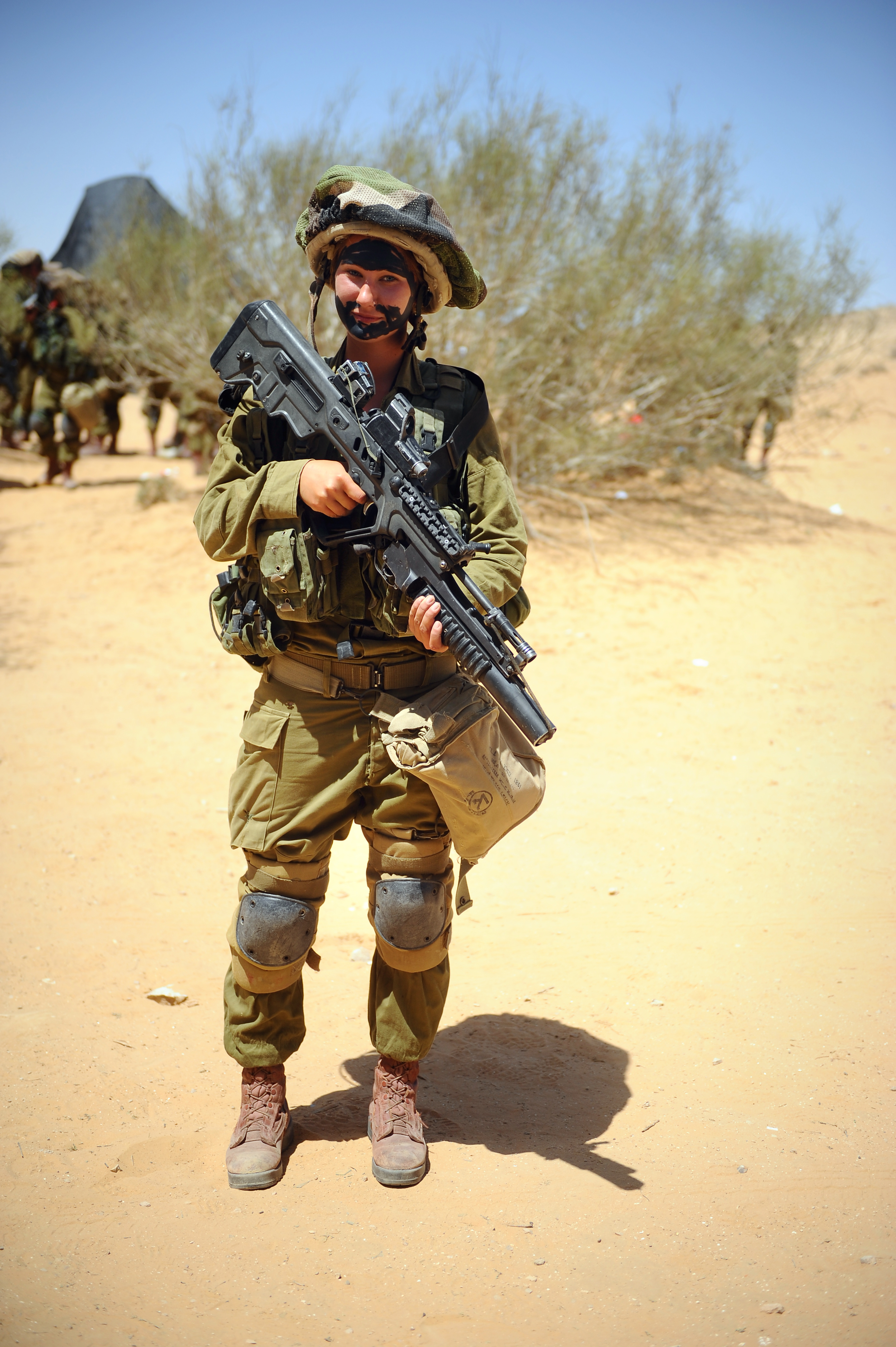
Caracal Battalion IDF combat soldier armed with the GTAR-21 which is equipped with a M203 grenade launcher

IWI produces the Tavor TAR-21 in different variations as outlined below.

=== TAR-21 ===
The Tavor TAR-21 is the standard variant with a 457 mm (18 in) long barrel.

==== GTAR-21 ====
The GTAR-21 has a notched barrel, to accept an M203 grenade launcher, or a licensed variant thereof, chambered in 40x46mm.

==== CTAR-21 ====
The CTAR-21 is a compact shorter 380 mm (15 in) barrel variant intended for commandos and special forces, but has become more favoured than the standard TAR-21 throughout the IDF.

==== STAR-21 ====
The STAR-21 is a designated marksman variant with folding under-barrel bipod and Trijicon ACOG 4× magnification sight

=== Tavor X95 ===
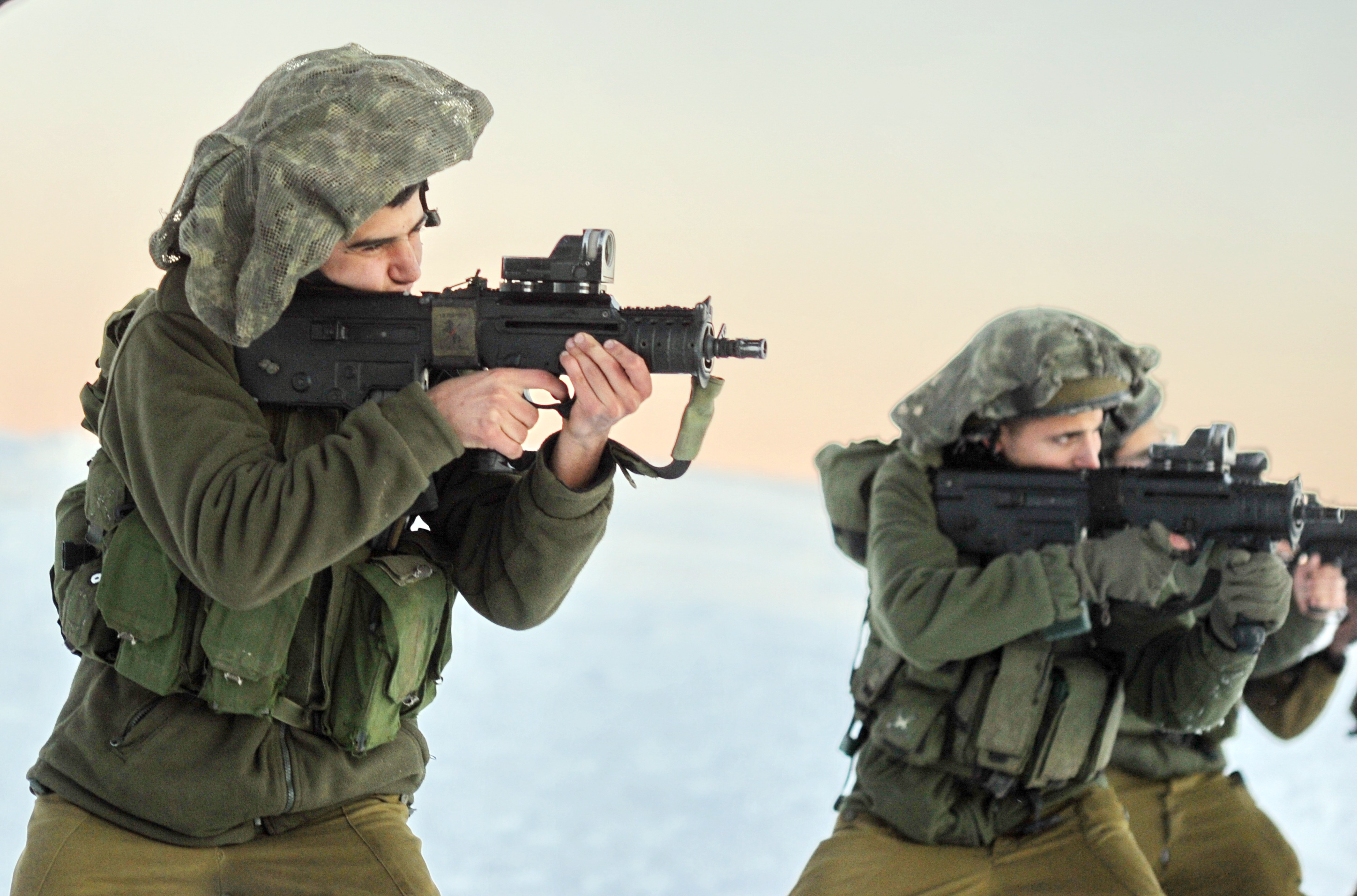
Israeli infantry with the IWI X95 "Micro-Tavor"

The X95 (previously known as the MTAR-21) is the variant of the Tavor that was selected as the future standard infantry weapon of the IDF in 2009. In 2013, the X95 was issued for the first time as the standard infantry weapon to recruits of the Givati Brigade.

With the use of a conversion kit, the X95 can be converted from a 5.56 mm assault rifle to a 9 mm submachine gun. A suppressor can also be added to the weapon, as part of the 9 mm conversion kit. A grenade launcher can also be attached to the X95.

=== Tavor 7 ===
The IWI Tavor 7 is derived from the Tavor TAR. Essentially a battle rifle, chambered in 7.62×51mm NATO. It is fully ambidextrous, features a 432 mm (17 in) barrel with a 730 mm (28.7 in) overall length. and a 508 mm (20 in) barrel with an 806 mm (31.7 in) overall length.

=== Ukrainian-licensed Tavors ===
Ukraine purchased a license for Tavors to be manufactured by Ukrainian firearm manufacturer RPC Fort. As of March 2021, Fort is no longer marketing them.

- Fort-221 – Ukrainian produced version of the CTAR-21 in 5.45×39 mm.
- Fort-222 – Ukrainian produced version of the STAR-21 in 5.45×39 mm.

=== TC-21 ===
The semi-automatic Tavor Carbine (TC-21) was first made available for civilian customers to purchase in Canada from 2008. The Canadian civilian version initially shipped with the Mepro reflex sight and a slightly longer barrel to meet the Canadian requirement for non-restricted semi-automatic centrefire rifles to have a barrel length of at least 470 mm. Current versions are shipped with a full-length Picatinny rail, without optics. In Europe, the Czech company Zeleny Sport recently (December 2015) imported Israeli-made TC-21s, equipped with Mepro M5 or M21 reflex sight, which are now available for both civilian and law enforcement customers.

In 2013, IWI started a US subsidiary, IWI US, which is manufacturing the semi-automatic TC-21 as the Tavor SAR for U.S. sales. The weapon is manufactured with a combination of Israeli and US parts. IWI US had shipped 50,000 Tavor SARs to US civilian customers by early 2016.

IWI US sells the Tavor SAR in variety of variants:

- TSB16: Semi-automatic version of the CTAR-21, with a 26 1/8 in (664 mm) overall length.
- TSB16L: A TSB16 with left-handed controls pre-installed.
- TSB16-BLK: A TSB16 chambered in .300 AAC Blackout.
- TSB17-9: 9×19 mm submachine gun with a 17 in (432 mm) barrel and a 26 1/8 in (664 mm) overall length.
- TSB18: 5.56×45 mm rifle with an 18 in (457 mm) barrel and a 27 5/8 in (702 mm) overall length.
- TSB18RS: 5.56×45 mm rifle with an 18 in (457 mm) barrel and a 30 in (762 mm) overall length; integrated permanent 2 3/8 in muzzle brake and a 10-round magazine to be compliant with laws of certain states. ("RS" stands for Restricted State.)
- TSIDF16: Semi-automatic version of the CTAR-21 without a full-length rail, an integrated MEPRO 21 sight, and a 26 1/8 in (664 mm) overall length; meant to be a semi-automatic replica of the CTAR-21 issued to the IDF.

Note: IWI US sells their Tavor SARs in a variety of colours, including Black (B), Flat Dark Earth (FD), and OD Green (G); the letter "B" subsequent to "TS" in the rifles' designations can be switched with any of the colours' respective letters.

==== Aftermarket parts ====
A significant aftermarket of spare and replacement parts has developed around the Tavor rifle family, including the development of match grade accurizing triggers for the bullpup rifle that are produced by manufacturers such as Geissele Automatics and double stage trigger pack TAV-D from Shooting Sight.

Shlomi Sabag, Deputy CEO of IWI, says that one of the indicators of the success of the rifle in the shooting sports or civilian market is the fact that "an aftermarket of products associated with the Tavor bullpup rifle, like triggers, has evolved very quickly".

== Sights ==
The ITL MARS (multi-purpose aiming reflex sight) is a gun sight that combines two sighting devices, a reflex sight and a laser sight, as well as a backup iron sight. It is designed and produced by ITL Optronics company, based in Israel. The laser may be either visible or infrared and can be activated as needed via a pressure switch. It has been purchased by a number of forces including the U.S. military for its M16 series weapons, Israel for its IMI Tavor TAR-21 rifle, and India (locally manufactured under license as raptor sight) for its INSAS rifle, as well as other commercial customers.

== Awards ==
American Rifleman magazine awarded the Tavor SAR the 2014 Golden Bullseye Award as its Rifle of the Year.

Shooting Illustrated magazine named the Tavor X95 as its 2017 Rifle of the Year.

== Users ==
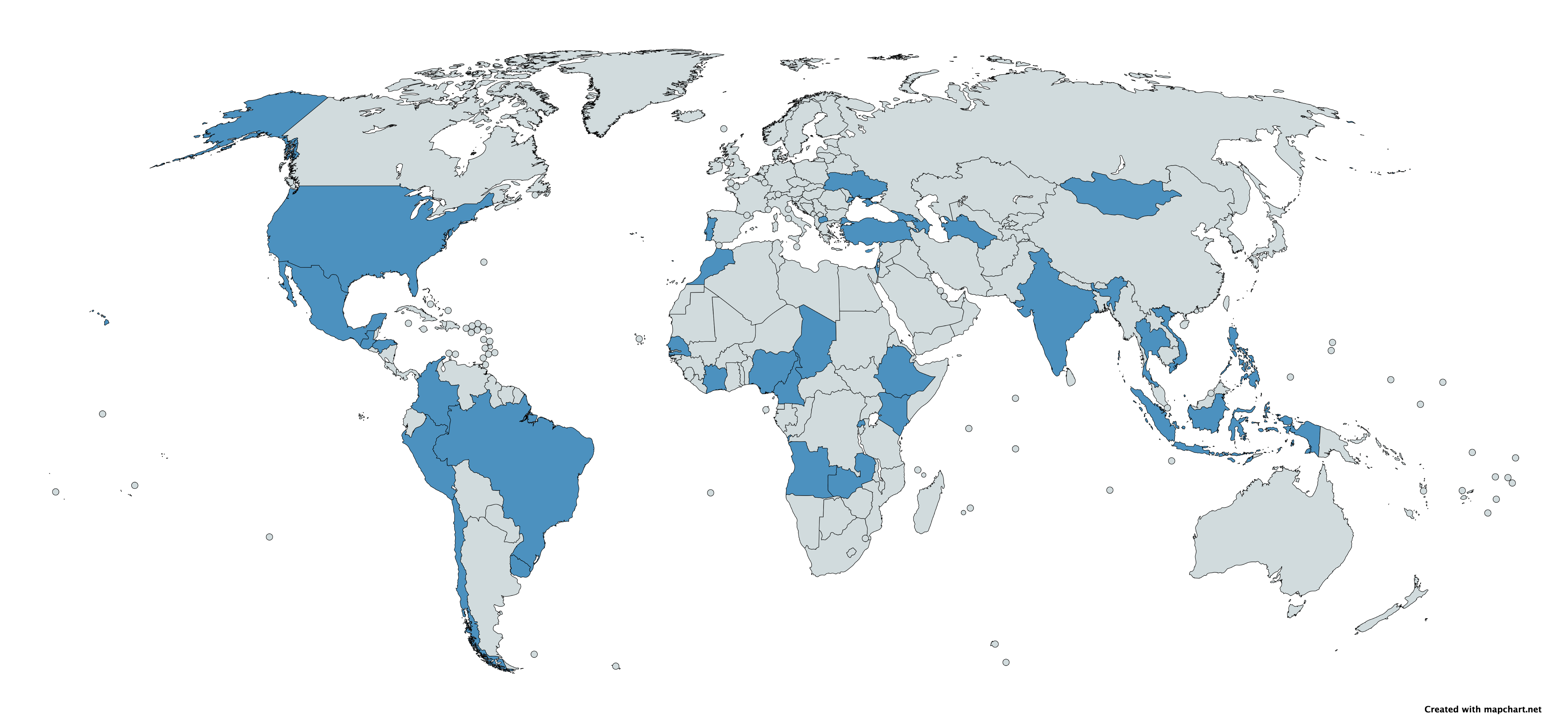
Map with Tavor users in blue

- Angola: Angolan Army purchase for Special Forces.
- Azerbaijan: Azerbaijan purchased a number of TAR-21 for the special operations forces of the Azerbaijani Army in August 2008.
- Brazil: Produced under license by Taurus for the military, but as of 2017, Taurus has never carried out a licensed production of the Tavor TAR. Small numbers are issued to soldiers in the Frontier Brigade.
- Cameroon: Issued to the Special Forces of Cameroon Army.
- Chad: Issued to Chadian Ground Forces since 2006.
- Colombia: Used by special forces and the National Police of Colombia.
- Chile: Investigations Police of Chile.
- Cyprus: The Tavor Χ95 assault rifle is used by Cypriot Special Forces.
- Ethiopia
- Georgia: Different variants of the weapon have been acquired and issued to law enforcement, special commando and protection units of the Georgian MIA since 2001. In 2004 the TAR-21 was to replace the Soviet Kalashnikov rifle, however due to lack of funding and low purchase quantity that idea was abandoned. The construction of a manufacturing plant was also considered.
- Guatemala: Guatemala's police force or PNC (Policia Nacional Civil) operates the TAR-21.
- Honduras: The Honduran Army operates the Tavor X95.
- India: In late 2002, India signed an ₹880 million (equivalent to ₹3.4 billion or US$35 million in 2023) deal with Israel Military Industries for 3,070 manufactured TAR-21s to be issued to India's special forces personnel, where its ergonomics, reliability in heat and sand might give them an edge at close quarters and deployment from inside vehicles. By 2005, IMI had supplied 350–400 TAR-21s to India's northern Special Frontier Force (SFF). These were subsequently declared to be "operationally unsatisfactory". The required changes were made and tests in Israel during 2006 went well, clearing the contracted consignment for delivery. The new GTAR-21s came with a modified single-piece stock, new sights and Turkish-made MKEK T-40 under-barrel grenade launchers chambered in 40x46mm. In 2011 the rifles were handed over to Para SF divisions. A consignment of over 500 Tavor TAR-21s and another 30 Galil sniper rifles worth over ₹150 million (US$1.6 million) and ₹20 million (US$210,000) respectively was delivered to the MARCOS (Marine Commandos) in December 2010. In 2016, IWI announced that it was establishing a 49:51 joint venture with Punj Lloyd in India, in order to manufacture rifle components in India.
- Indonesia: Used by BRIMOB Police Special Forces.
- Ivory Coast: Used by Ivorian Special Forces.
- Israel: See: Trials and service
- Kenya
- Mexico: In service with the Ministry of Public Security since 2011.
- Morocco: General Directorate for National Security equipped with the Tavor X95. The first Arab or North African country to use the Tavor X95 publicly.
- Nigeria: The State Security Service employ it as the primary assault rifle for their close protection and tactical units replacing the Uzi.
- North Macedonia: Used by Rapid Deployment Unit (Tar-21) and Special Anti-terrorist Unit – Tiger (Tavor x95) .
- Peru
- Philippines: Small quantities in use by special units of the Philippine Marines and Philippine Drug Enforcement Agency and one PNP SWAT team in Pasig.
- Portugal: Small quantities of the TAR-21 are in use by field and intervention units of the Polícia Judiciária, like hostage negotiation teams and investigators who usually work alongside other dedicated law enforcement intervention units—the Special Operations Group (GOE) and the National Republican Guard's Special Operations Company (COE); these weapons were initially intended to equip a new unit under the command of the Polícia Judiciária resembling the GOE. The TAR-21 also participated in the competition for the new service rifle for the three branches of the Portuguese Armed Forces and the Police Special Operations Group (GOE)—a bid that also included the local production of the TAR-21 in Portugal. However, the TAR-21 was excluded from the shortlist. The competition has meanwhile been annulled, after the other contenders and both political and defence critics accused the competition of favouring the Heckler & Koch G36.
- Rwanda
- Senegal: Issued to the Special Forces of the Senegal Army.
- Thailand: 76,000 in use
- Turkey: Used by Special Forces Command in executive protection role.
- Turkmenistan
- Ukraine: Yuriy Lutsenko, then head of Ministry of Internal Affairs of Ukraine, announced on October 1, 2008, that IWI and Ukrainian state-owned company RPC Fort would jointly manufacture Tavor TAR to enter service with special Ukrainian military and police units. RPC Fort had displayed working samples of Tavor TARs chambered in 5.45×39mm cartridge with Milkor 40mm UBGL grenade launchers to showcase to Ukrainian security forces officers as a means of convincing them to buy Ukrainian-made Tavor TARs for special forces units. In December 2009, a resolution was adopted to purchase the Fort 221 chambered in 5.45x39 for Ukrainian intelligence/border guard agencies, purchased in small numbers. It was subsequently adopted in 2014 for Ukrainian military and police forces. Known users include Ukrainian Spetsnaz forces and the Scorpion unit.
- United States: In August 2013, IWI US announced that the Pennsylvania Capitol Police had adopted the Tavor SAR, a variant specifically designed for the U.S. market. In July 2014, it was announced that the Lakewood, New Jersey Police Department would begin to adopt the Tavor SAR, after the weapon "met the demands and requirements of the Lakewood PD for reliability, ease-of-maintenance, durability and accuracy". The Hidalgo County Sheriff's Office in Texas, operate Tavor SAR.
- Uruguay: On 13 October 2021, it was reported that the Uruguayan Ministry of the Interior acquired some 200 Tavor X-95s, manufactured by IWI, for the Uruguayan National Republican Guard Directorate. Training was carried out by an instructor from IWI, brought especially to Uruguay for that purpose. The Uruguayan police also purchased thousands of Tavor rifles from IWI.
- Vietnam: From 2012, the TAR-21 entered service in special units of the Vietnamese Army, equipping special forces, naval infantries and navy personnel.
- Zambia: Used by the Zambian Army Special Forces Group.
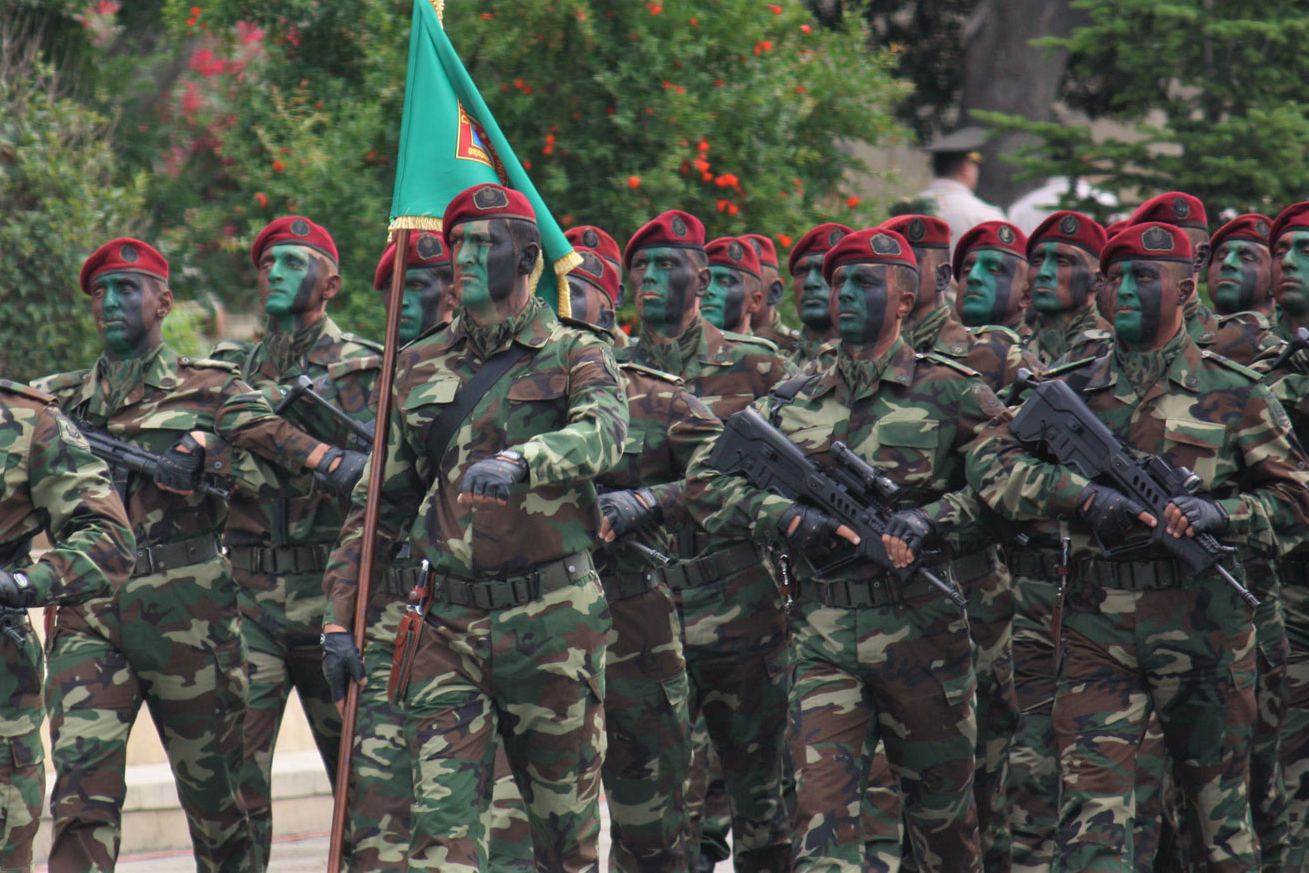
Members of the Azerbaijani Special Forces march with TAR-21 during a military parade in Baku

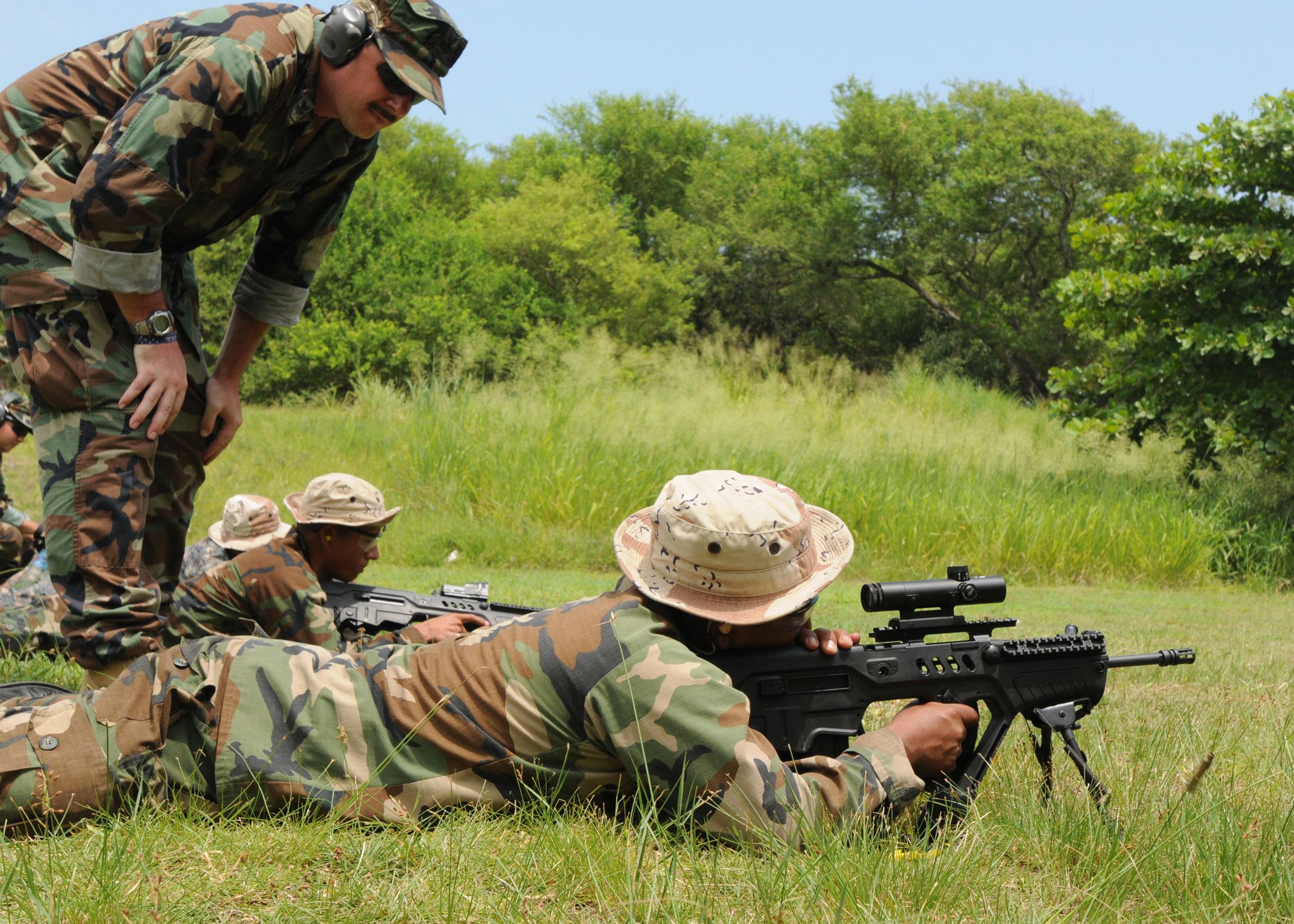
Guatemalan Navy special forces with STAR-21 designated marksman rifle

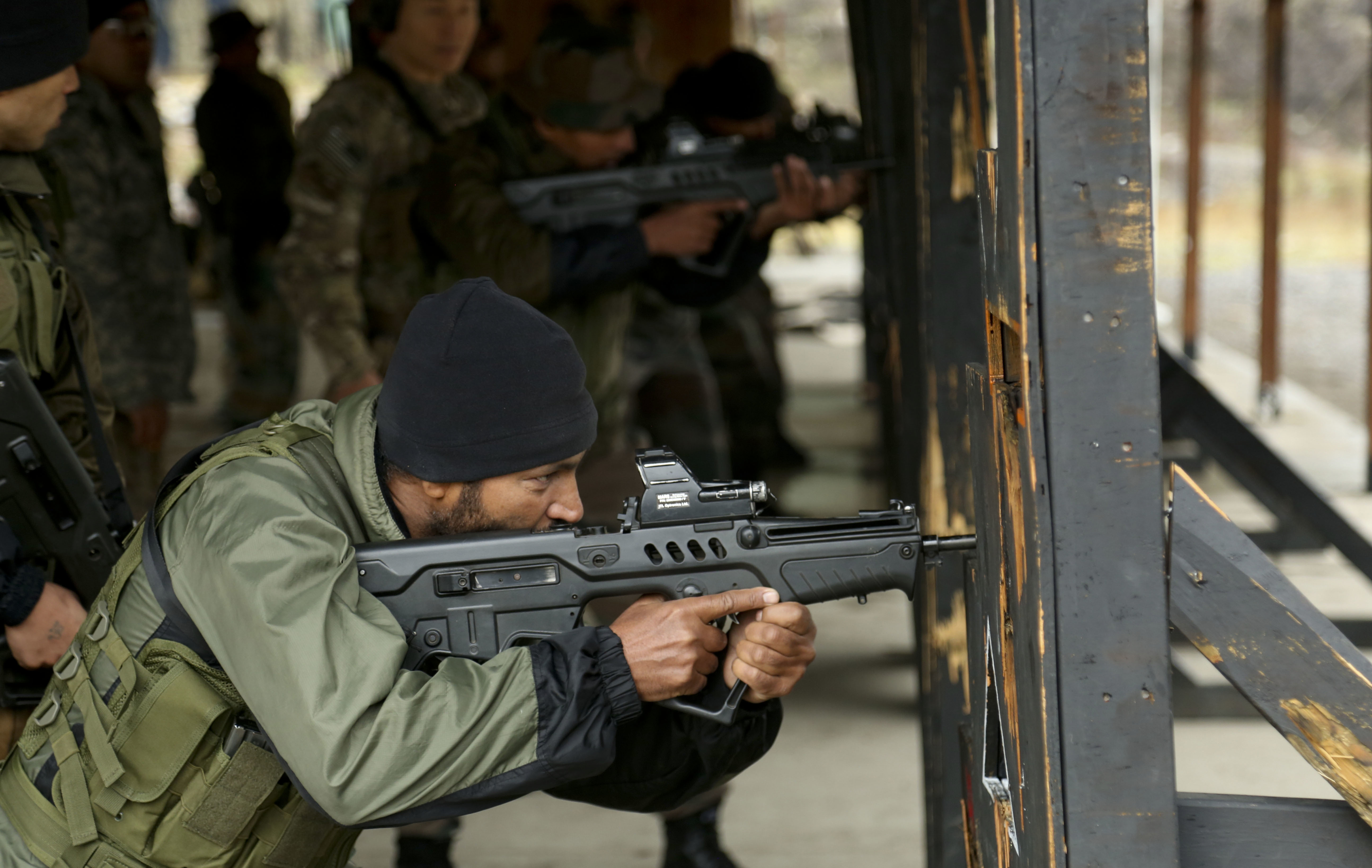
Tavor CTAR used by Para SF of the Indian Army

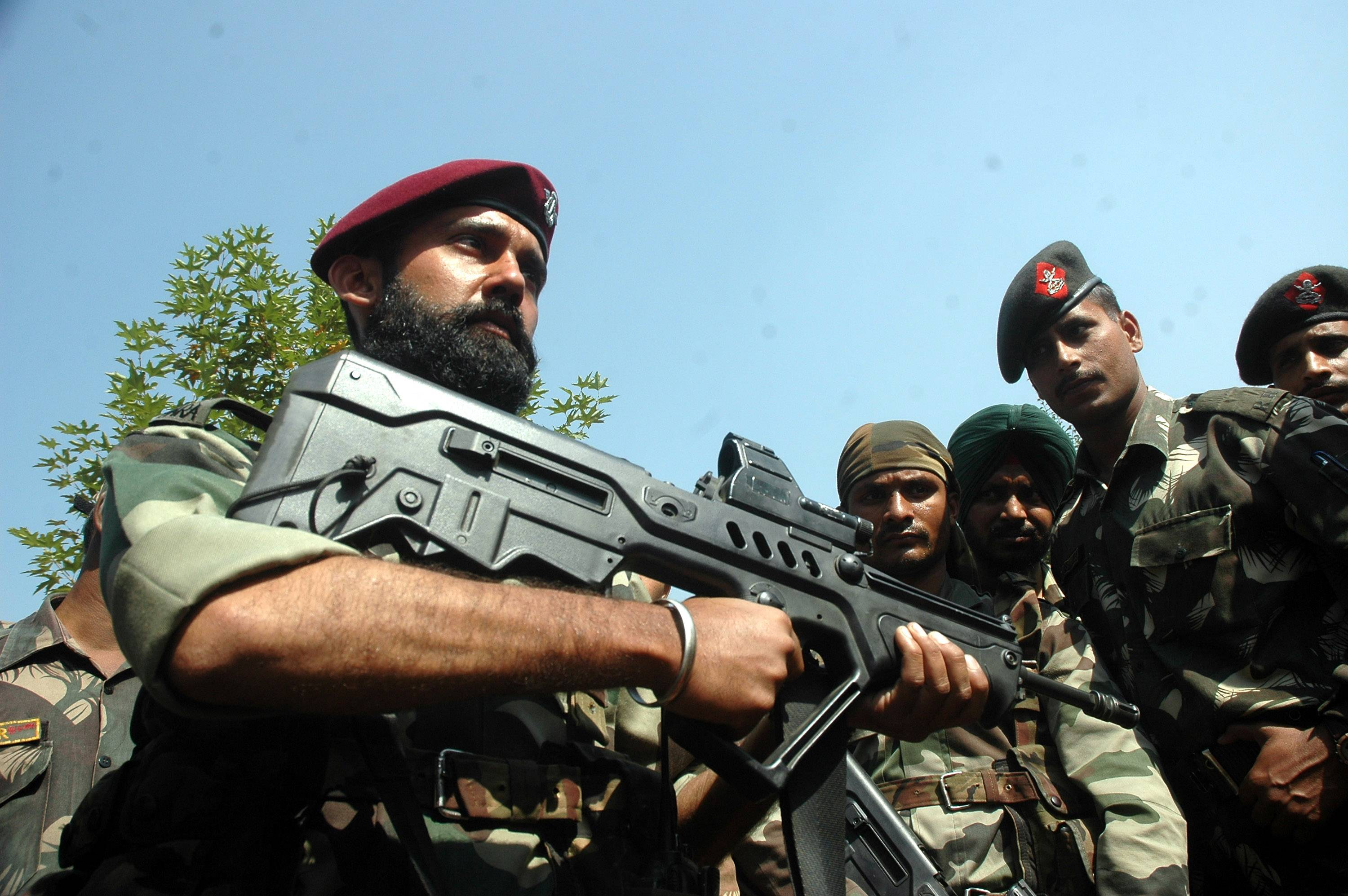
Indian Army Para SF soldier equipped with Tavor TAR

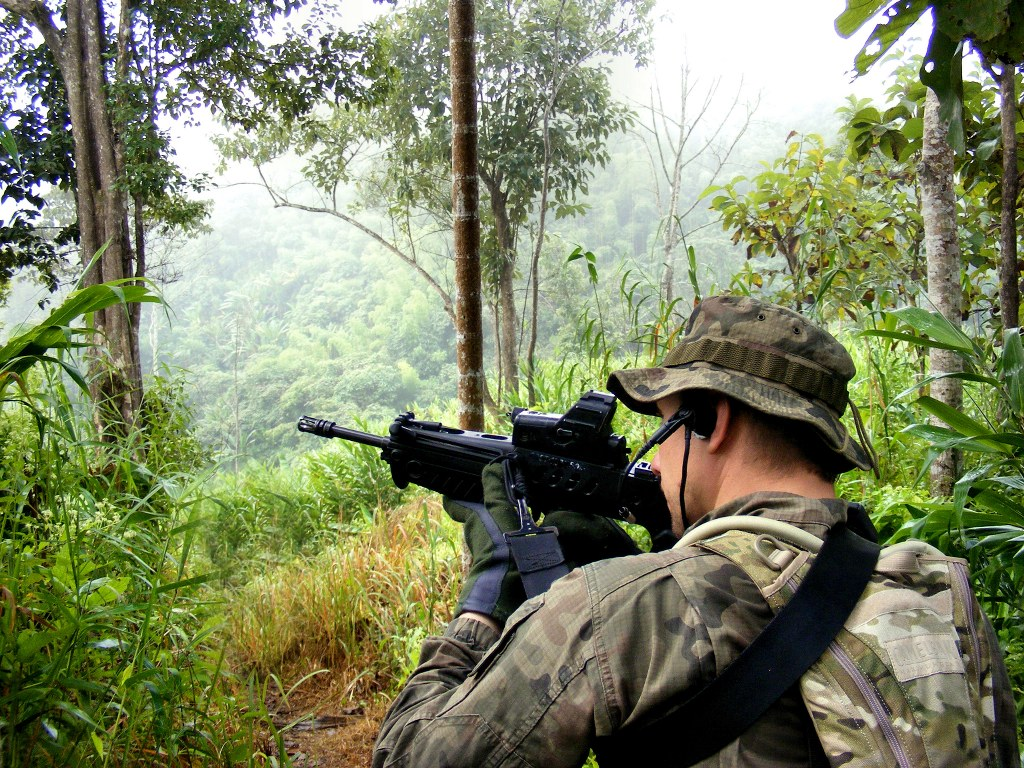
Polish JW Grom trains with a Tavor TAR-21 during Tiger Claw at CIJWS

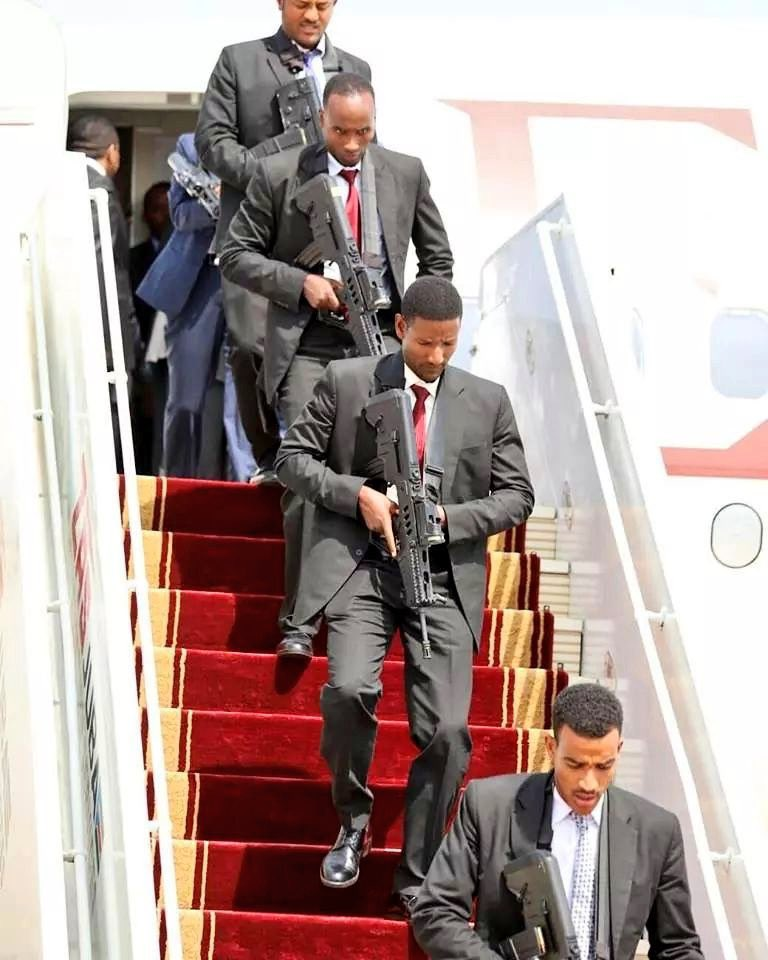
Ethiopian Republican Guards disembarking from an Ethiopian Airlines flight protecting Prime Minister Abiy Ahmed in Sudan with TAR-21s

== See also ==
- IWI Tavor TS12
