= Defense Acquisition Program Administration =

Government agency of South Korea

- 방위사업청
- Emblem of the Defense Acquisition Program Administration

Agency overview
- Formed: 1 January 2006; 20 years ago
- Jurisdiction: Government of South Korea
- Headquarters: Building #3,4, Government Complex-Gwacheon, 47, Gwanmun-ro, Gwacheon-si, Gyeonggi-do, South Korea; 37.4253371°N 126.9836011°E
- Employees: 1,638 (2023)
- Annual budget: ₩16.91 trillion US$12.4 billion (2023)
- Agency executives: Lee Yong-cheol, Minister; Kim Il-dong, Vice Minister
- Parent department: Ministry of National Defense
- Child agencies: Agency for Defense Development; Defense Agency for Technology and Quality
- Website: Official DAPA website in English; Official DAPA website in Korean

Korean name
- Hangul: 방위사업청
- Hanja: 防衛事業廳
- RR: Bangwi saeopcheong
- MR: Pangwi saŏpch'ŏng

The Defense Acquisition Program Administration (DAPA, Korean: 방위사업청) is a central administrative agency of the South Korean Ministry of National Defense. It was founded on 1 January 2006 as part of a comprehensive reform of defense acquisition, including the introduction and development of military equipment. The DAPA has exclusive authority to plan and budget defense development and procurement programs for the Republic of Korea Armed Forces and to enact Korean Defense Specifications (KDS). Sub-agencies of DAPA include the Agency for Defense Development (ADD) responsible for defense development and Defense Agency for Technology and Quality (DTaQ) responsible for defense improvement programs and defense quality certification tests.

== DAPA's founding background ==
In South Korea, the acquisition and procurement of arms were an important area that required a huge budget and determined national security. South Korea has also made several improvements in the Ministry of National Defense to reform its defense acquisition project in the process of strengthening its defense capabilities. Based on the evaluation results of the Yulgok project, which was a plan to reinforce and modernize the South Korean military, the Ministry of National Defense established an acquisition office in January 1999 by integrating the work related to the introduction of arms into one department.

However, as corruption scandals related to the introduction and development of arms continued, efforts to improve the defense procurement system resumed after the inauguration of President Roh Moo-hyun's government. In late December 2003 and late January of the following year, President Roh Moo-hyun ordered improvements to the defense acquisition program, and in early March 2004, the Prime Minister's Office established the Defense Acquisition System Improvement Committee. After that, in early August 2005, a preparatory committee was established to improve the defense acquisition, and on 1 January 2006, the Defense Acquisition Program Administration was founded after reorganization, enactment, and manpower securing.

== Agencies ==
- Agency for Defense Development (ADD)
- Defense Agency for Technology and Quality (DTaQ)

== Ministers ==
Ministers of the DAPA
Name	Took office	Left office	Note
Kim Jung-il (김정일)	January 1, 2006	July 25, 2006	29th Korea Military Academy graduated, Former Korean Army Major General
Lee Sun-hee (이선희)	August 9, 2006	March 7, 2008	18th Korea Air Force Academy graduated, Former Korean Air Force Brigadier General
Yang Chi-gyu (양치규)	March 8, 2008	January 19, 2009	29th Korea Military Academy graduated, Former Korean Army Major General
Byeon Moo-geun (변무근)	January 20, 2009	August 16, 2010	24th Korea Naval Academy graduated, Former Korean Navy Lieutenant General
Jang Soo-man (장수만)	August 16, 2010	February 16, 2011	Passed the 15th Korean Fifth Grade Public Service Examination
Noh Dae-lae (노대래)	March 18, 2011	March 15, 2013	Passed the 23rd Korean Fifth Grade Public Service Examination, 17th Chairperson of the Fair Trade Commission
Lee Yong-geol (이용걸)	April 15, 2013	November 18, 2014	Passed the 23rd Korean Fifth Grade Public Service Examination
Jang Myeong-jin (장명진)	November 19, 2014	July 19, 2017	12th Reserve Officers' Training Corps (ROTC) graduated, Former ADD researcher
Jeon Je-guk (전제국)	August 7, 2017	August 30, 2018	Passed the 22nd Korean Fifth Grade Public Service Examination
Wang Jung-hong (왕정홍)	August 31, 2018	December 24, 2020	Passed the 29th Korean Fifth Grade Public Service Examination
Kang Eun-ho (강은호)	December 25, 2020	June 22, 2022	Passed the 33rd Korean Fifth Grade Public Service Examination, Former Korean Army Lieutenant
Eom Dong-hwan (엄동환)	June 23, 2022	February 18, 2024	44th Korea Military Academy graduated, Former Korean Army Brigadier General
Seok Jong-gun (석종건)	February 19, 2024	November 16, 2025	45th Korea Military Academy graduated, Former Korean Army Major General
Lee Yong-cheol (이용철)	November 17, 2025	Incumbent	First DAPA Vice Minister

== Defense Acquisition Program Promotion Committee ==
In order to deliberate upon and coordinate major policies, management of financial resources and other purposes for the promotion of defense acquisition programs, the Defense Acquisition Program Promotion Committee was placed under the control of the Minister of National Defense. Through the Committee, with the minister of National Defense as chairman, project promotion methods and model decisions are discussed and adjusted and defense capacity improvement projects are implemented.

== Major procurement programs ==
DAPA currently manages 1064 items of variety defense procurement programs. Examples of current and past procurement programs include:

=== Infantry weapon ===
- K1 selective-fire assault rifle
- K2 assault rifle
- K3 light machine gun
- K4 automatic grenade launcher
- K5 pistol
- K6 heavy machine gun
- K7 silenced submachine gun
- K13 carbine, formerly STC-16 (Science & Technology Carbine-16)
- K14 sniper rifle
- K15 light machine gun
- K16 general-purpose machine gun, formerly S&T Motiv K12
- K17 carbine, update version of STC-16 and its official name.

=== Missile systems ===
- Hycore hypersonic cruise missile system
- Bigung (Poniard) 2.75-inch in diameter guided rocket system
- K136 Kooryong 36 extended multiple rocket launcher system
  - Biryong (Flying Dragon) short range ship-to-ship guided weapon system based on K136
- K239 Chunmoo multiple launch rocket system (MLRS)
- Hyungung (AT-1K Raybolt) medium range infantry missile system
- Cheongeom (Taipers) air-to-ground guided missile system
- Hongsangeo (Red Shark) anti-submarine rocket system
- Haeseong-I (Sea Star) ROK Navy's main subsonic anti-ship cruise missile system
  - Haeseong-II (SSM-710K) enhanced cruise missile system
    - Haeseong-III (SSM-750K) enhanced cruise missile system
- Korean supersonic anti-ship cruise missile system
- Haeryong (Sea Dragon) tactical ship-launched land attack missile based on the Haeseong I
- Ure (KTSSM) short-range tactical surface-to-surface ballistic missile system
- Hyunmoo ballistic missile system

=== Missile defense systems ===
- M-SAM medium-range surface-to-air guided weapon system based on technology from the 9M96 missile used on S-350E and S-400 missile systems
  - Cheongung-II enhanced medium-range surface-to-air guided weapon system
- Haegung (K-SAAM) surface-to-air anti missile system
- Cheonma (Pegasus) short-range surface-to-air missile system
- Shingung (KP-SAM) shoulder-launched surface-to-air missile
- L-SAM multi-layered missile defense system

=== Ground weapon systems ===
- KH178 105 mm towed howitzer
- KH179 155 mm towed howitzer
- K105A1 (EVO-105) 105 mm wheeled self-propelled artillery
- K9 Thunder 155 mm self-propelled howitzer
- K2 Black Panther main battle tank
- K131 light utility vehicle
- K151 military light utility vehicle
- K311 logistics and utility vehicle
- K511 logistics and utility vehicle
- K711 logistics and utility vehicle
- K200 infantry fighting vehicle
- K21 infantry fighting vehicle
  - K21-105 light tank
- AS21 (Redback) infantry fighting vehicle
- KW1 Scorpion (White Tiger) wheeled armoured personnel carrier
- Biho (K30) twin 30 mm self-propelled anti-aircraft guns
  - Cheonho (KA2) twin 30 mm wheeled self-propelled anti-aircraft guns
- Barracuda 4x4 armored wheeled vehicle
- Tigon 6x6 armored wheeled vehicle
- Korean Amphibious Assault Vehicle-II (KAAV-2)
- Unmanned Surveillance Vehicle
- K-NBC reconnaissance vehicle
- High energy laser

=== Maritime and underwater weapon systems ===
- Harbor Underwater Surveillance System (HUSS)
- Towed Array Sonar System (TASS)
- Torpedo Acoustic Counter Measure (TACM)
- FFG sonar system
- KDX-III batch-II integrated sonar system
- Jangbogo-III class (KSS-III) batch-I combat system
- Jangbogo-III class (KSS-III) batch-I sonar system
- Landing Platform Helicopter (LPH) combat system
- Patrol Killer Guided (PKG) missile-class combat system
- Ulsan-Class (FF) batch-I combat system
- Ulsan-Class (FF) batch-III combat system
- Dolgorae (Dolphin) midget submarine
- Multi-Mission Unmanned Surface Vehicle (MMUSV)
- Cheongsangeo (Blue Shark) light anti-submarine torpedo
- Baeksangeo (White Shark) heavy anti-submarine torpedo
- Beomsangeo (Tiger Shark) heavy anti-submarine torpedo

=== Aircraft and UAV systems ===
- KAI KF-21 Boramae 4.5 generation fighter aircraft
- KAI T-50 Golden Eagle family of supersonic advanced trainers and multirole light fighters, including the following variants:
  - T-50 (advanced trainer version)
  - TA-50 (lead-in fighter trainer and light attack version)
  - FA-50 (multirole fighter all-weather version)
  - T-50B (aerobatic specialized T-50 version for the ROKAF's aerobatic display team, the Black Eagles)
- KAI KUH-1 Surion medium transport helicopter
- KAI KT-1 Woongbi basic training aircraft
  - KA-1 tactical control aircraft
- KGGB (Korean Guided GPS Bomb) precision guided glide bomb
- KAI RQ-101 Songgolmae corps level reconnaissance UAV
- KAI NCUAV next-generation corps level reconnaissance UAV
- Korean Air KUS-FS multipurpose medium-altitude long-endurance unmanned aerial vehicle
- KAI LAH light armed helicopter
- Blackout bomb

=== Surveillance and reconnaissance systems ===
- Radar for land systems
- KF-21 Active electronically scanned array (AESA) Radar
- Ulsan-Class (FF) batch-I AESA Radar
- Synthetic Aperture Radar (SAR) for KUS-FS
- Korean Commander's Panoramic Sight (KCPS) for K1A1
- Korean Gunner's Primary Sight (KGPS) for K2 Black Panther
- Sight system for K21 infantry fighting vehicle
- Thermal Observation Device (TOD)
- Electro-Optical Tracking System (EOTS) for PKG combat system
- Infrared Search and Track (IRST) for shipborne systems
- Forward-looking infrared (FLIR) system for KUH-1
- Tactical Electro-Optical and Infrared reconnaissance system (Tac-EO/IR)
- Electro-Optical and Infrared system for KUS-FS MUAV
- Electro-Optical and Infrared system for corps level reconnaissance UAV-II
- Infrared camera for satellites
- Multi-sensor and multi-source imagery fusion system

=== Command and control and information warfare systems ===
- Tactical Information Communications Network (TICN)
- Joint Tactical Data Link System (JTDLS)
- Air Defense Command Control and Alert (ADC2A) system
- Airborne ELINT pod system
- Tactical communication Electronic Warfare (EW) system-II (TLQ-200K)
- Airborne Electronic Countermeasure (ECM) pod system (ALQ-200)
- Shipboard electronic warfare system (SLQ-200K)
- Advanced SIGINT aircraft system

=== Space technologies ===
- Reconnaissance space-based surveillance and reconnaissance system
- Small satellite system
- Military satellite communication system-I
  - Military satellite communication system-II

=== Core technologies ===
- Seeker
- Laser Detection and Ranging (LADAR)
- Optical Phased Array-Based LADAR
- Navigation technology
- Micromachined inertial sensors
- Fibre-Optic Gyroscope (FOG)
- Hemispherical Resonator Gyroscope (HRG)
- Control Moment Gyroscope (CMG)
- Star tracker
- Terrain referenced navigation
- Ground-Based Radio System (GRNS)
- Anti-jamming technology
- Global Navigation Satellite System (GNSS) Jamming
- Rocket propulsion
- Ramjet propulsion
- Engine Technology (subsonic gas Turbine and high speed) for missiles and UAV
- Defense materials
- Fuel cells and special batteries
- underwater acoustic sensor
- Hyperspectral image equipment
- EMP (Electromagnetic Pulse) technology
- Directional Infrared Countermeasure (DIRCM)
- High Energy Material (HEM)
- Ballistic protection technology
- Precision-guided munition
- Railgun
- Dual barrel air-burst technology for XK13 25 mm OCSW, Cancelled in 2013.
- Warrior platform
- AI-based autonomy technology
- Autonomous tunnel exploration robot
- Rescue robot
- Tailless demonstrator UAV for KUS-FC unmanned combat aerial vehicle
- Unmanned Combat Compound Rotorcraft (UCCR)
- Anti-Submarine Warfare Unmanned Underwater Vehicle (ASWUUV)
- Supercavitating torpedo
- Cyber security technologies
- Verification of chemical warfare agents
- Detoxification technology

=== Future technologies ===
- Artificial intelligence
- Blockchain
- Internet of Military Things (IoMT)
- Quantum technology
- Photonic radar technology
- Atomic technology
- Terahertz technology
- Perovskite solar cell
- Self-generated electrostatic energy
- Synthetic biology
- Meta-material for stealth technology
- Biomimetic robot
- Swarming unmanned system technology
- Boost phase interceptor
- Counter long-range artillery interceptor system
- Intelligent self-learning-based autonomous jamming
- Centralized sequential kill-chain

=== Other ===
- S&T Daewoo K11 DAW assault rifle

== See also ==
- Defense industry of South Korea
