= S&T Daewoo XK8 =

Daewoo XK8/ DAR-21
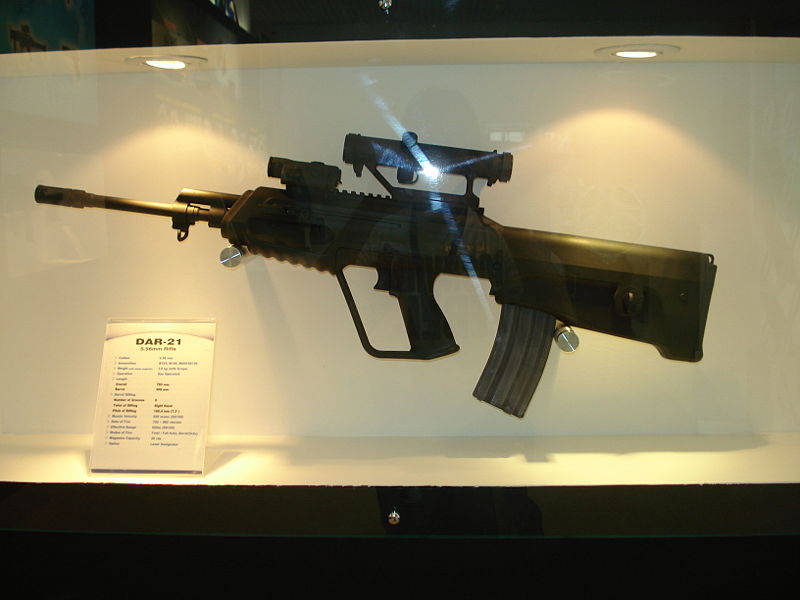
- XK8 rifle on display. A riflescope is mounted on the picatinny rail.
- Type: Bullpup assault rifle
- Place of origin: Republic of Korea

Production history
- Designer: S&T Motiv
- Manufacturer: S&T Motiv
- No. built: Preproduction prototypes only

Specifications
- Mass: 3.50 kg (7.7 lb) (w/o magazine)
- Length: 780 mm
- Barrel length: 508 mm
- Cartridge: 5.56×45mm NATO
- Caliber: 5.56mm
- Action: Gas-operated, Tappet type
- Rate of fire: 850 rounds/min
- Muzzle velocity: 940 m/s
- Effective firing range: 600m (point target)
- Feed system: Various STANAG magazines.
- Sights: Various scopes via picatinny rail

S&T Daewoo XK8, also known as DAR-21 (Daewoo Assault Rifle-21st Century), is a 5.56×45mm NATO bullpup assault rifle developed and manufactured by S&T Daewoo intended to replace Daewoo Precision Industries K2 assault rifle for the Republic of Korea Armed Forces.

XK8 was the first firearm developed solely by the Korean defense company without the request from the military. However, after the field tests by Republic of Korea Army Special Warfare Command, it was rejected and was not mass-produced.

== History ==
S&T Motiv started to develop a prototype in 2003 with technical support from the ADD. Maintenance costs and reliability of the K1 were deteriorating after 20 years of mass production, and S&T Motiv aimed to replace the K2 rifle as the next generation rifle and mass-produce it. The prototype finished development before the end of the year and was publicly revealed. S&T Motiv asked the Korean Ministry of National Defense to hold field test. However, after the test the MND favored the K11.

After the XK8 was rejected by the Korean Armed Forces, the XK8 did not see mass-production nor did it receive export orders.

== Development ==
The XK8 was made out of high-strength plastic and polymer materials with the ejection port on the right side and the cocking lever on the left side. The fire selector consists of semi-auto, three round burst and full auto.

== See also ==
- Daewoo Precision Industries K2
- Daewoo Precision Industries K1
- S&T Daewoo K11
