= Daewoo Telecom K7 =

Submachine gun

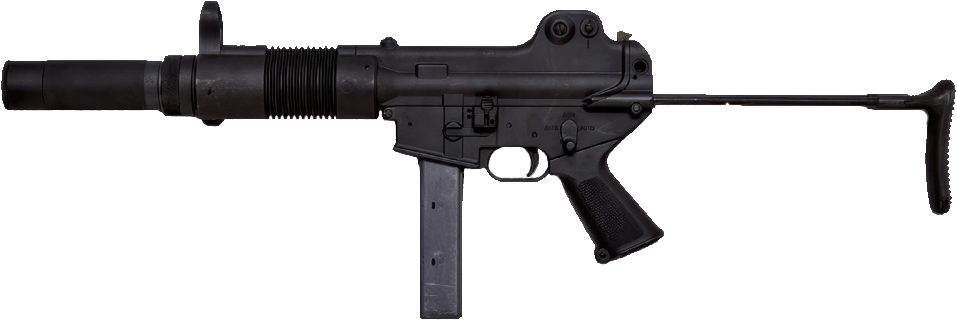
- Daewoo K7 Sub-machine gun
- Type: Submachine gun
- Place of origin: South Korea

Service history
- In service: 2001–present
- Used by: See Users

Production history
- Designer: Agency for Defense Development; Daewoo Telecom
- Designed: 1998–2000
- Manufacturer: Daewoo Telecom (1999–2002); Daewoo Precision (2002–2006); S&T Daewoo (2006–2012); S&T Motiv (2012–2021); SNT Motiv (2021–present)
- Unit cost: ₩ 2,800,000
- Produced: 2001–present

Specifications
- Mass: 3.1 kg (6.8 lb)
- Length: 788 mm (31.0 in) (extended); 606 mm (23.9 in) (retracted)
- Barrel length: 134 mm (5.3 in)
- Cartridge: 9×19mm Parabellum
- Caliber: 9mm
- Action: Blowback
- Rate of fire: 1,050–1,250 rounds/min
- Muzzle velocity: 295 m/s (968 ft/s)
- Effective firing range: 100 to 150 m (110 to 160 yd)
- Feed system: 30-round (30-round magazines can also be used from Uzi or 32-round magazines from Beretta PM12s)
- Sights: Iron sights

The Daewoo Telecom K7 is a 9×19mm Parabellum submachine gun with an integral suppressor used by the Republic of Korea Armed Forces. It is based on the Daewoo K1A assault rifle, but is simplified by utilizing a blowback action rather than the gas impingement system of its parent firearm.

It was first displayed outside of Korea in the United Arab Emirates at the IDEX (International Defence Exhibition) 2003 convention.

The K7 is currently manufactured by SNT Motiv.

== History ==
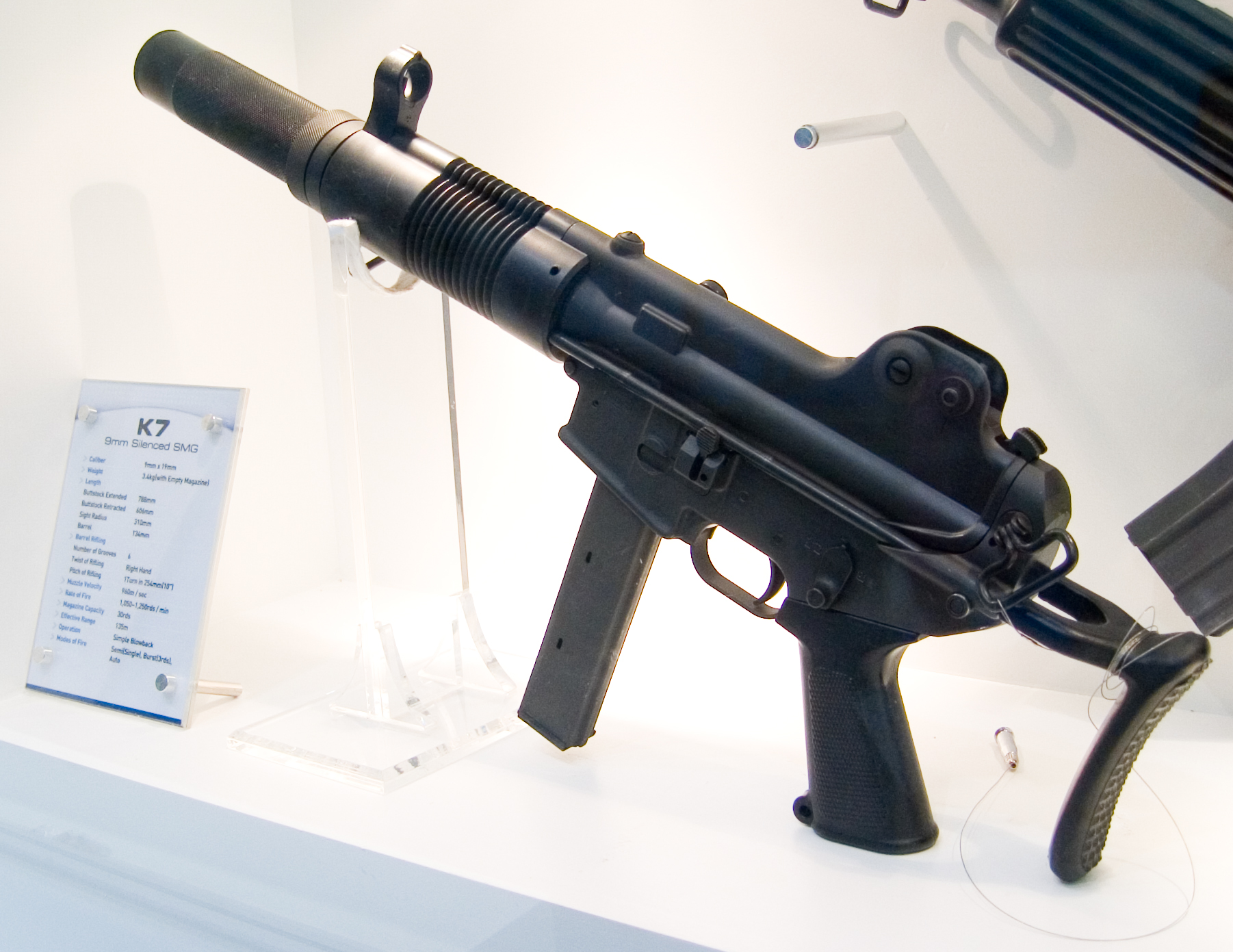
Daewoo K7 SMG at Defense Asia 2006

Despite the fact that the H&K MP5SD6 was already in service with the Republic of Korea Armed Forces by the time the K7 reached production status, most of the special forces relied on unconventional weapons during covert operations due to high price of imported and domestically produced SMGs. Due to the substantial cost of the importation and production of such weapons, the Republic of Korea Army Special Warfare Command requested the development of an integrally suppressed submachine gun that would be less expensive to import or manufacture than the MP5SD6.

The Defense Agency for Technology and Quality (DTaQ), a part of the Agency for Defense Development (ADD), and Daewoo Telecom (now SNT Motiv), a subbranch of Daewoo Group, officially started development in April 1998, finishing the project in December 2000.

In 2020, Iran revealed an indigenous submachine gun that has the design based on the K7. It was also seen at the Victory Day National Arms Exhibition on May 24, 2021, with suppressed and non-suppressed versions. Later, Iranian President Ebrahim Raisi's bodyguard, who attended a martyr's celebration on 20 March 2023, was seen carrying a K7. At the time it was unveiled, there was suggestions that Iran obtained actual K7s from Indonesia.

According to a report by the Korea Customs Service (KCS) in March 2024, a former SNT employee was caught exporting some 480,000 gun parts and production equipment worth ₩26.6 billion ($19.7 million) illegally copied from September 2019 to March 2023 to a state-owned defense contractor in the Middle Eastern country. It is believed that illegally copied K7s and production equipment were introduced to Iran during this period, even though the South Korean government prohibits arms exports to Iran in principle.

== Design ==
The K7 does not use the direct gas impingement system of the K1A. Instead, the K7 utilizes a simple blow-back system. The bolt reciprocates while the gun is being fired and locks back when the magazines are completely exhausted. A 30-round vertical box magazine is used and it can also use the 30-round magazines taken from the IMI Uzi or 32-round magazines from the Beretta Model 12. As the magazine well of the K1A was retained, there are internal accommodations for the smaller 9 mm magazine. There are 3 firing modes, single shot, a 3-round burst and fully automatic. However, prolonged fully automatic fire has been shown to damage and degrade the baffles within the integral suppressor. As a result of the light bolt, a cyclic rate of fire of 1,050–1,250 rounds per minute is achieved.

An integral suppressor is featured on the K7, which leaves users the option to use standard 9mm Parabellum ammo instead of using subsonic ammo. The K7's upper receiver is based on that of the K2, albeit slightly modified. The hammer/fire control unit and telescopic stock are also derived from those of the K1.

It can be outfitted with a PK Designlab-made weaponlight with built-in picatinny railing. As the K7 was developed from the Daewoo K1A, it features parts that can be interchanged with those of the K1 and vice versa.

=== Suppressor ===
The suppressor reduces the pressure of the gas produced during discharge, and by extension, reduces the amount of noise generated. In addition, the suppressor significantly distorts the sound of the gunshot so that it is very difficult to pinpoint the location of the shooter. Tests on precision noise measuring equipment 3 meters away showed that firing in semi-auto mode had an average noise of 93.5 dB with the suppressor installed and 117 dB with the suppressor removed.

According to specifications, the average durability of the suppressor is known to be 2,000 shots, but the manufacturer's own test showed that even if it fired up to 6,000 shots, there was no deterioration in performance. It was also reported that no deterioration in the performance of the suppressor was found in the K7 used by the South Korean military for 17 years.

== Users ==
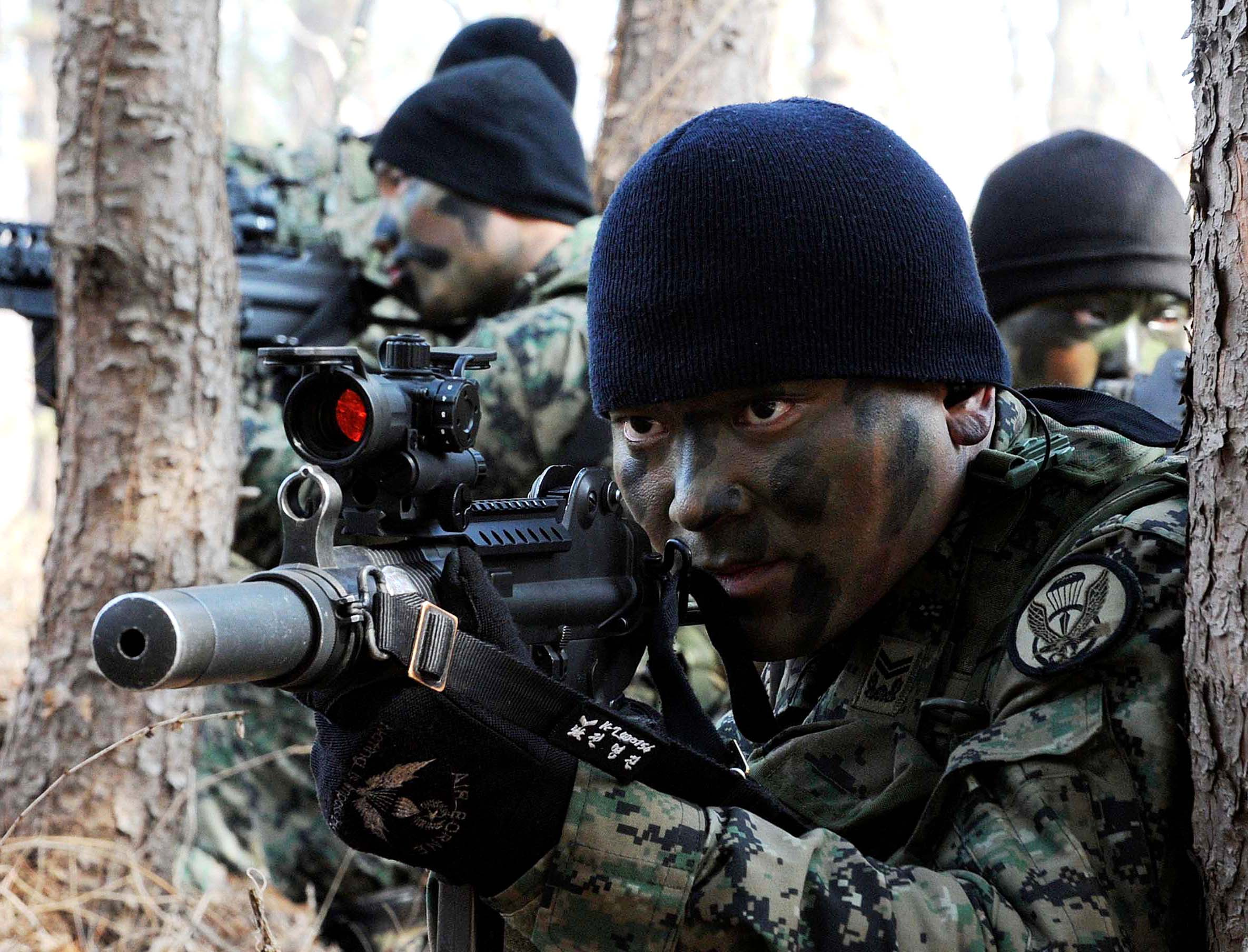
South Korean special forces soldier with the suppressed K7 during drills in 2014.

- Bangladesh:
- Cambodia
- Indonesia: Komando Pasukan Katak (Kopaska) tactical diver group and Komando Pasukan Khusus (Kopassus) special forces group. As of 2019, a SIPRI small arms report indicates around 1,786 K7s were transferred to Indonesia. As of 2021, Indonesia operates 6 times more than South Korean inventory.
- Iran: An unknown number of K7s. The K7 is also used as a standard firearm for Iranian presidential guards.
- Papua New Guinea: Used by Royal Papua New Guinea Constabulary.
- South Korea: Used by ROKASWC and ROKNSWF.

=== Trial use ===
- Thailand: A 2019 SIPRI small arms report indicate that two K7s were transferred to Thailand.

== See also ==
- Daewoo Precision Industries K1
- S&T Daewoo XK9

== Bibliography ==
- Bishop, Chris (2006). The Encyclopedia of Small Arms and Artillery. Grange Books. pp. 230–231. ISBN 978-1-84013-910-5.
