= SNT Motiv =

South Korean defence company

SNT Motiv Co., Ltd.
- Native name: SNT모티브 주식회사
- Formerly: Daewoo Precision Industries (1981–1999); Daewoo Telecom (1999–2002); Daewoo Precision (2002–2006); S&T Daewoo (2006–2012); S&T Motiv (2012–2021)
- Type: Public
- Traded as: KRX: 064960
- Industry: Automotive industry; Arms industry
- Founded: December 1981; 44 years ago
- Headquarters: 363, Yeoraksongjeong-ro, Cheolma-myeon, Gijang-gun, Busan, South Korea
- Key people: Kim Tae-kwon (CEO)
- Products: Auto parts; Firearms
- Revenue: ▲ ₩1.0449 trillion (2022)
- Operating income: ▲ ₩111.9 billion (2022)
- Net income: ▲ ₩87.5 billion (2022)
- Total assets: ▲ ₩1.2255 trillion (2022)
- Total equity: ▲ ₩879 billion (2022)
- Owner: SNT Holdings (41.10%); Treasury stocks (9.53%); National Pension Service (8.28%); Treasury stocks (Trust) (2.17%)
- Number of employees: 938 (March 31, 2014)
- Parent: SNT Holdings
- Website: Official website in Korean; Official website in English

SNT Motiv Co., Ltd. (Korean: SNT모티브) is a South Korean firearms and auto parts manufacturer founded in 1981. Its firearms equip most frontline units of the Republic of Korea Armed Forces.

== History ==
Daewoo Precision Industries Co., Ltd was established in December 1981 as a wholly owned subsidiary of Daewoo to manufacture small arms, and upright/grand pianos under the Sojin and Daewoo brands.

The Sojin musical instrument factory of Yeoju, South Korea, had been purchased by Daewoo in 1977. Sojin produced guitars, and commenced manufacture of upright pianos in 1976. Between 1980 and 1991, Daewoo exported pianos under the following names; Sojin, Royale, Daytron, Daewoo, Schafer & Sons, Sherman Clay (until 1987), and Cline, in addition to private labels.

In 1986, the company diversified into auto parts manufacture, followed by digital pianos in 1989. In 1990, the company produced 13,452 upright, 2,364 grand, and 2,120 digital pianos.

In 1991, Daewoo purchased a 33% share of the German piano maker Ibach, sold its Sojin manufacturing equipment to a Chinese firm, and replaced the equipment with Ibach machinery. Pianos were produced to a higher standard, using components such as Renner actions and Delignit wrestplanks. Also in 1991, Dongbei Piano Factory in Yingkou City, China, formed an agreement with Daewoo to help produce upright pianos (its sole product), using high-quality local wood in Liaoning province, northeastern China. This arrangement was extended in 1996 to include grand piano production.

In December 1992, the company was listed on the Korean stock exchange.

In 1997, Daewoo ceased production of pianos, with Dongbei Piano Factory buying most of Daewoo’s equipment and designs. Some of Daewoo’s designers and technicians moved to work for Dongbei.

Following the collapse of Daewoo, the company was spun off in February 2002 and relisted on the Korean stockmarket in March 2002. The majority of its shares were purchased by S&T Holdings in June 2006 and it was renamed S&T Daewoo Co., Ltd in September 2006. In March 2012 the company was renamed S&T Motiv Co., Ltd.

In DX Korea 2018, the company announced development of a 9mm revolver based on requirements for Korean law enforcement agencies, and an AR-10-type rifle for a potential Korean military contract.

In February 2021, S&T Motiv changed its name to SNT Motiv.

== Firearms ==
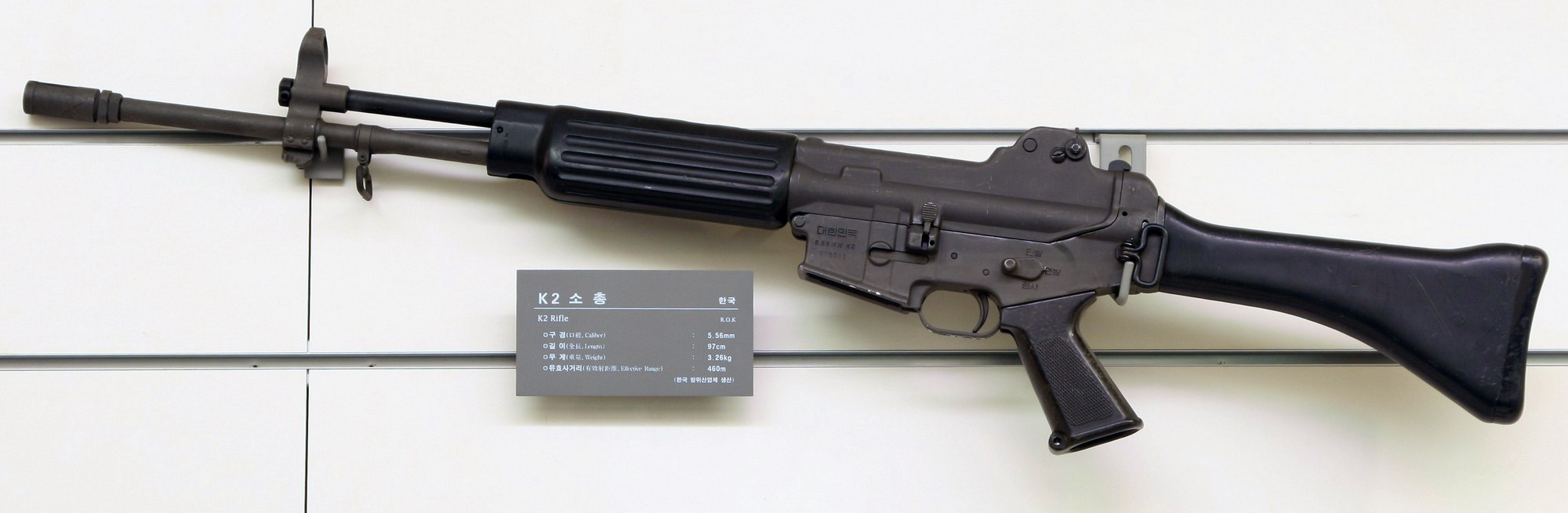
K2 assault rifle at the War Memorial of Korea

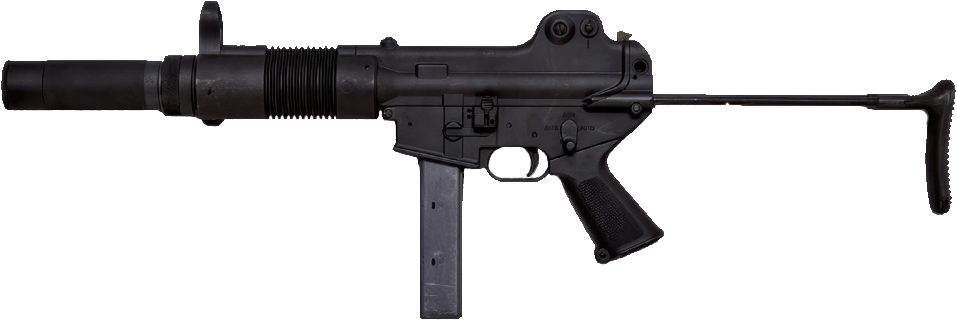
K7 submachine gun

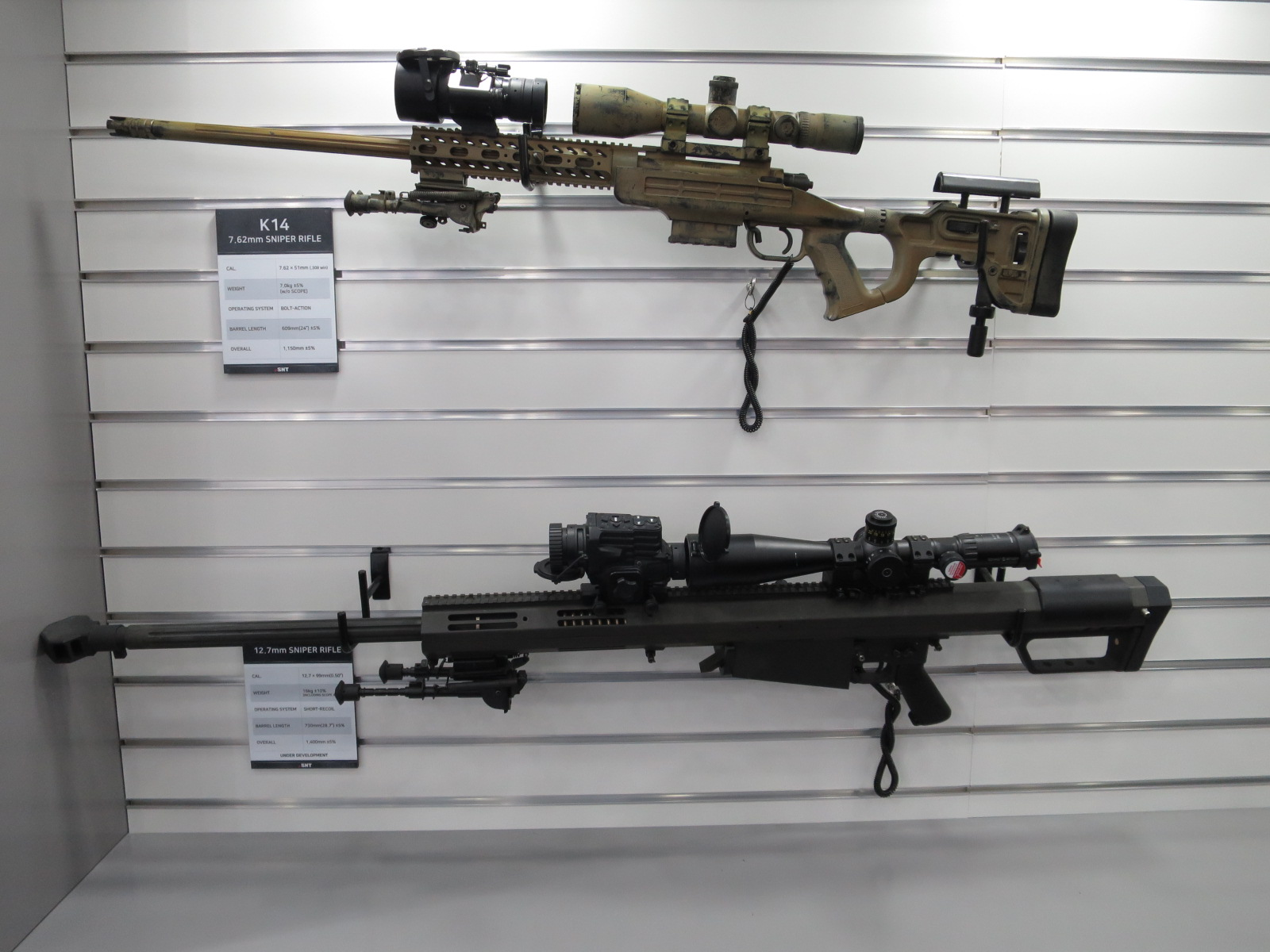
K14 and STSR20 sniper rifles at IDEX 2023

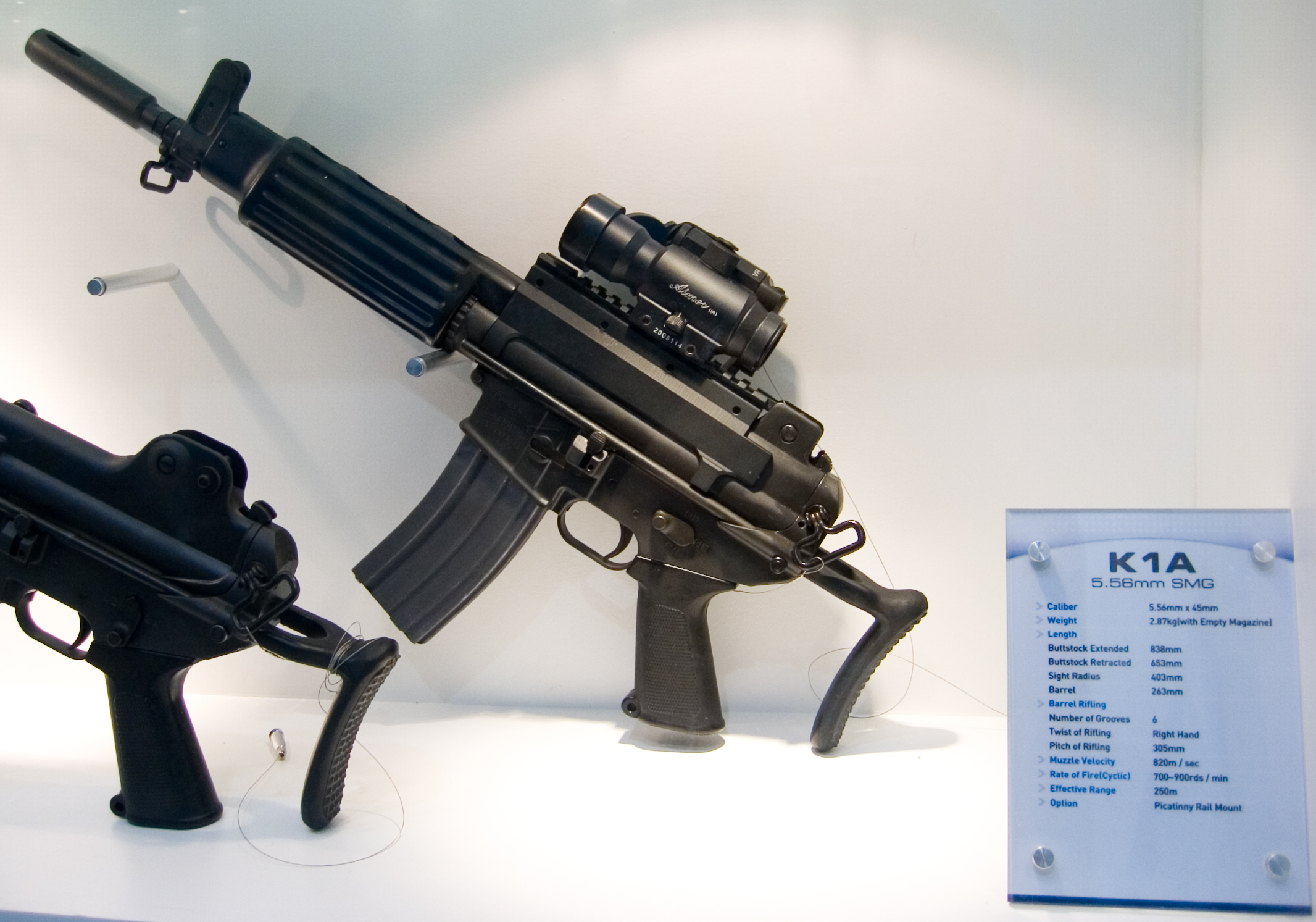
Daewoo K1A at Defense Asia 2006

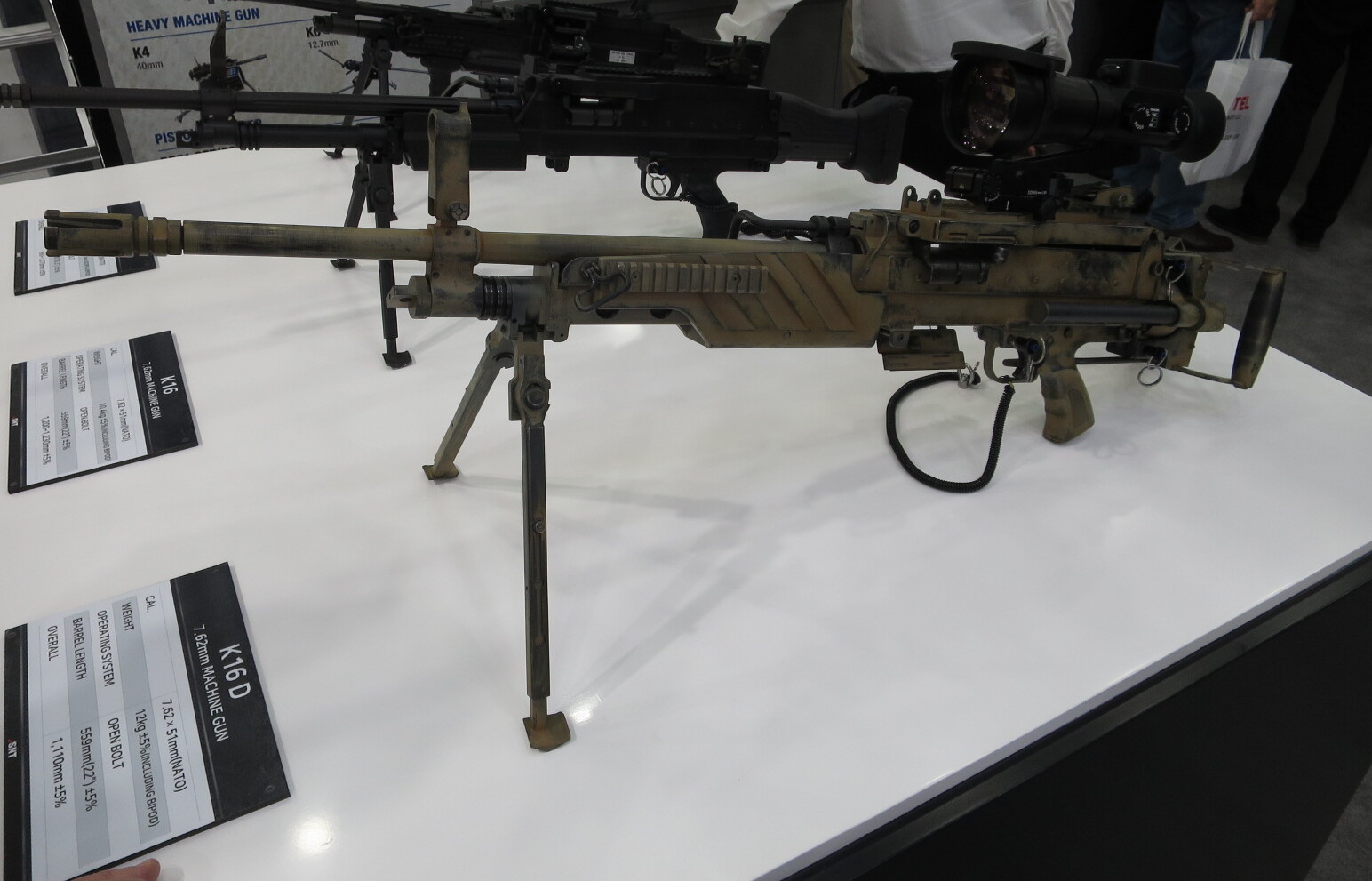
K16 machine guns at IDEX 2023

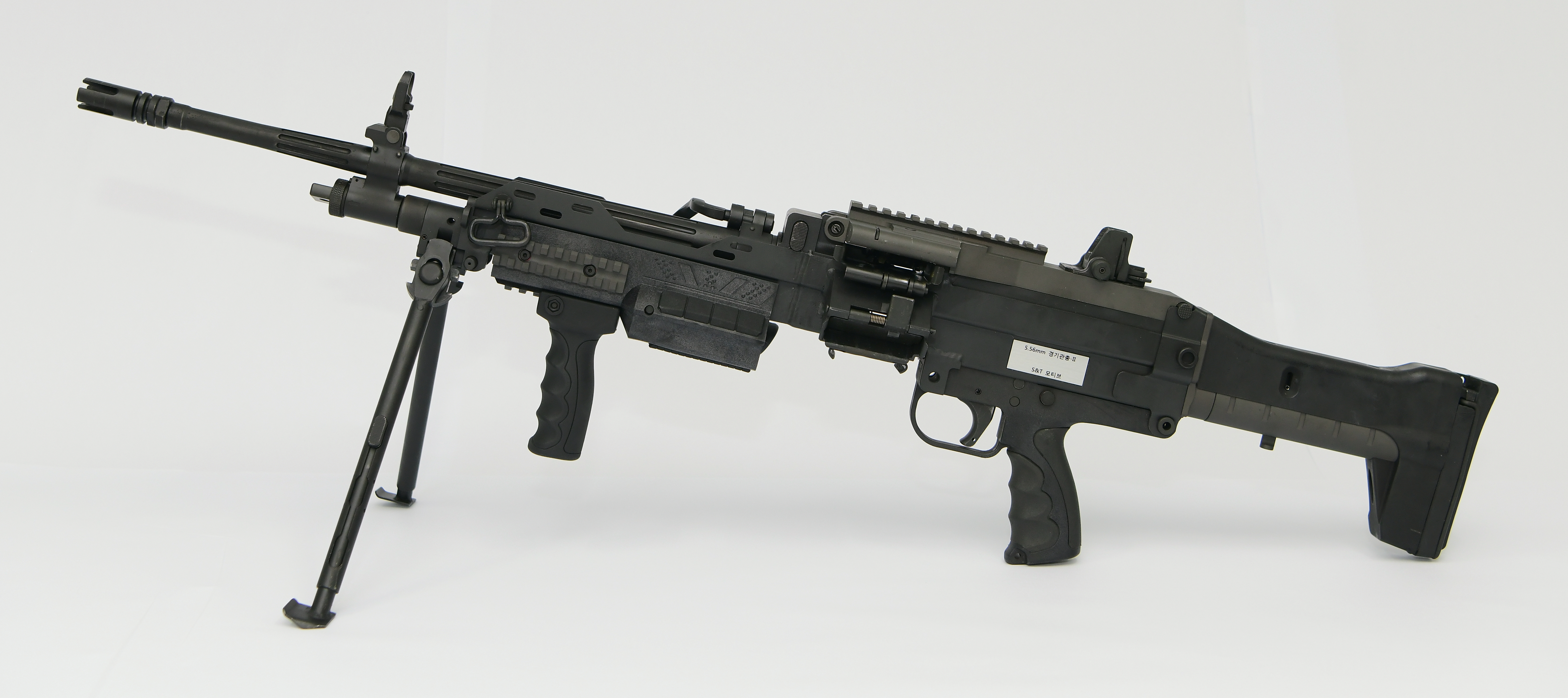
K15 Light Machine Gun

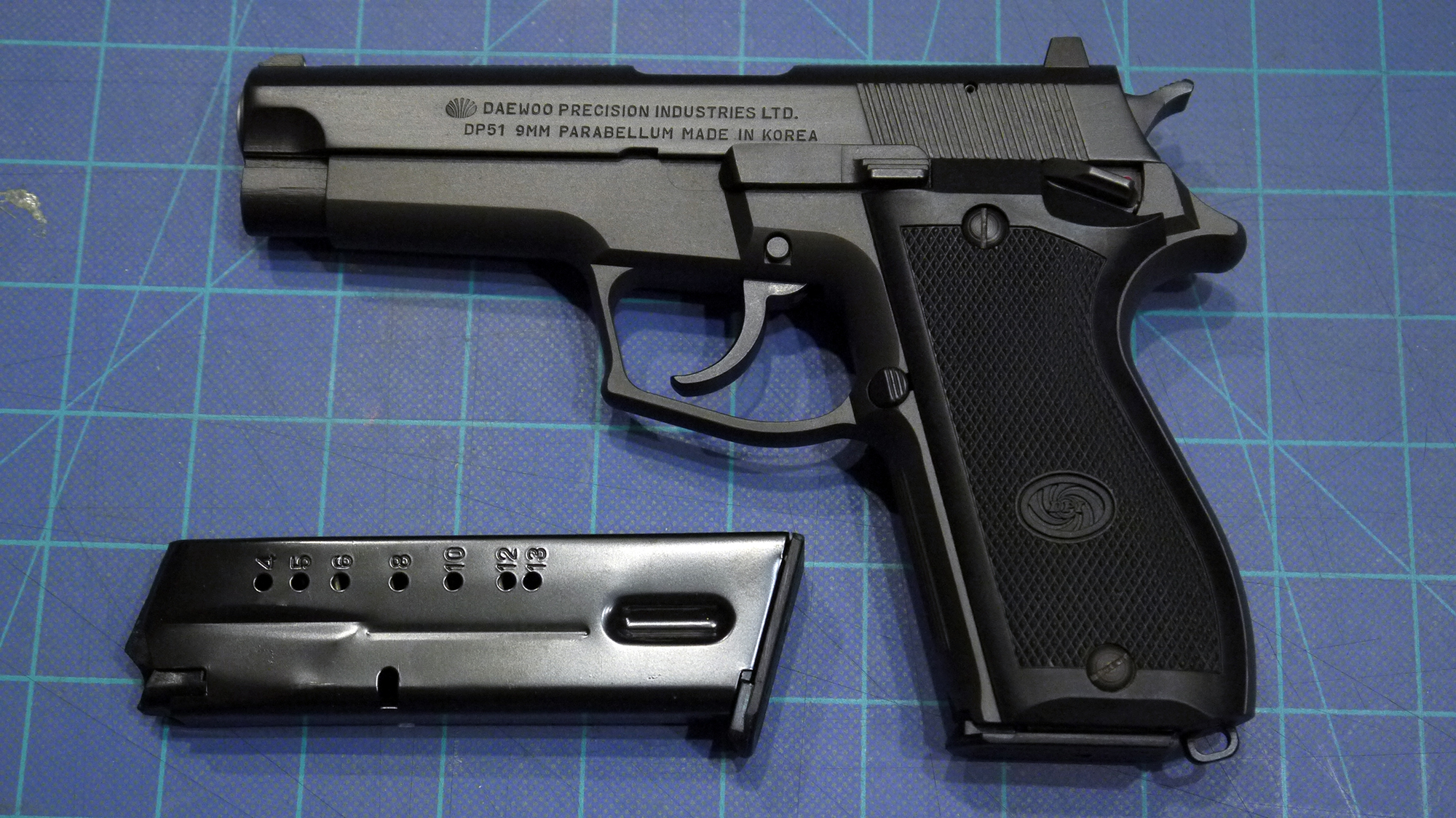
9mm Daewoo K5

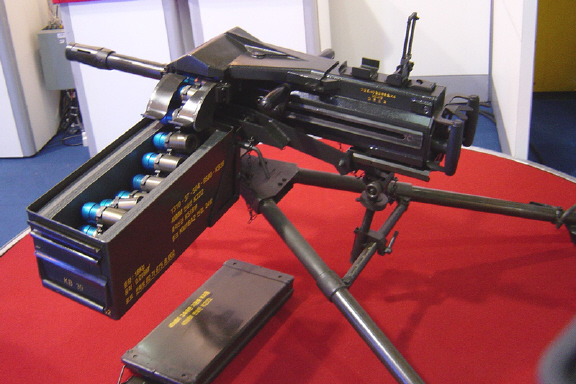
K4 automatic grenade launcher

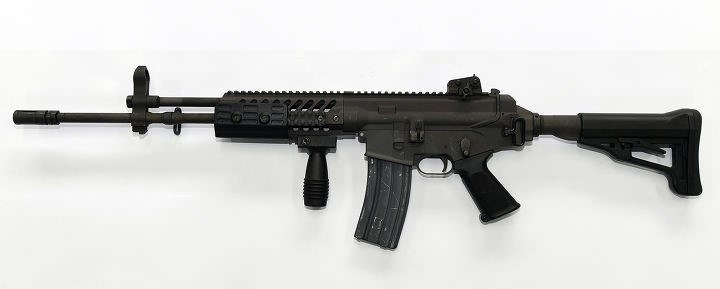
K2C1 Assault rifle, with vertical foregrip attached.

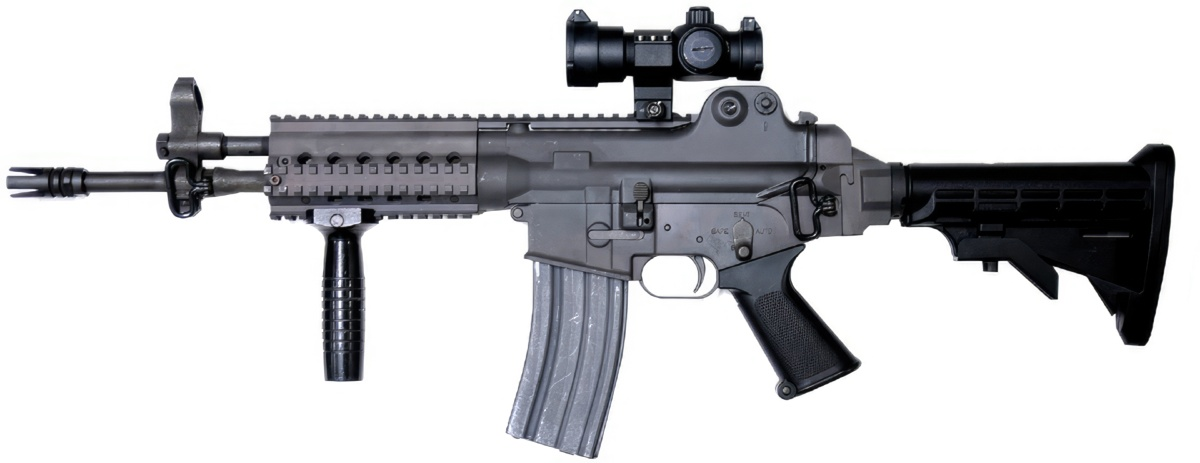
K2C Carbine, equipped with optical sight an vertical foregrip.

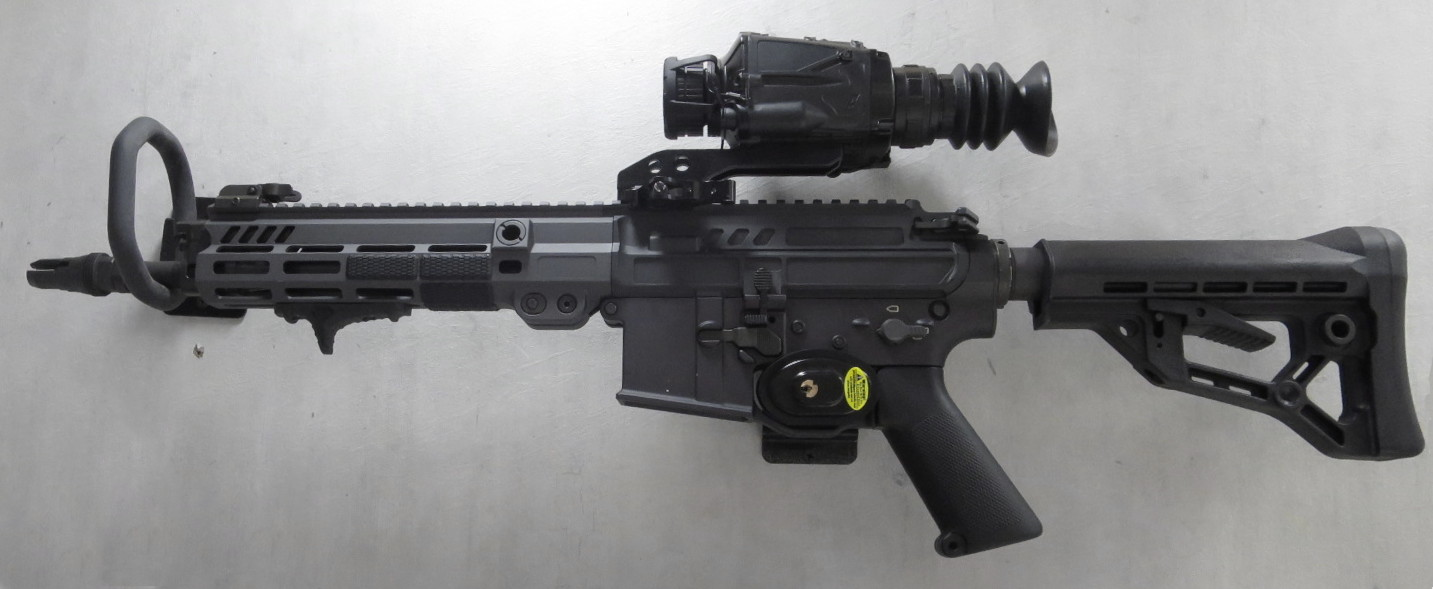
K13 assault rifle at IDEX 2025

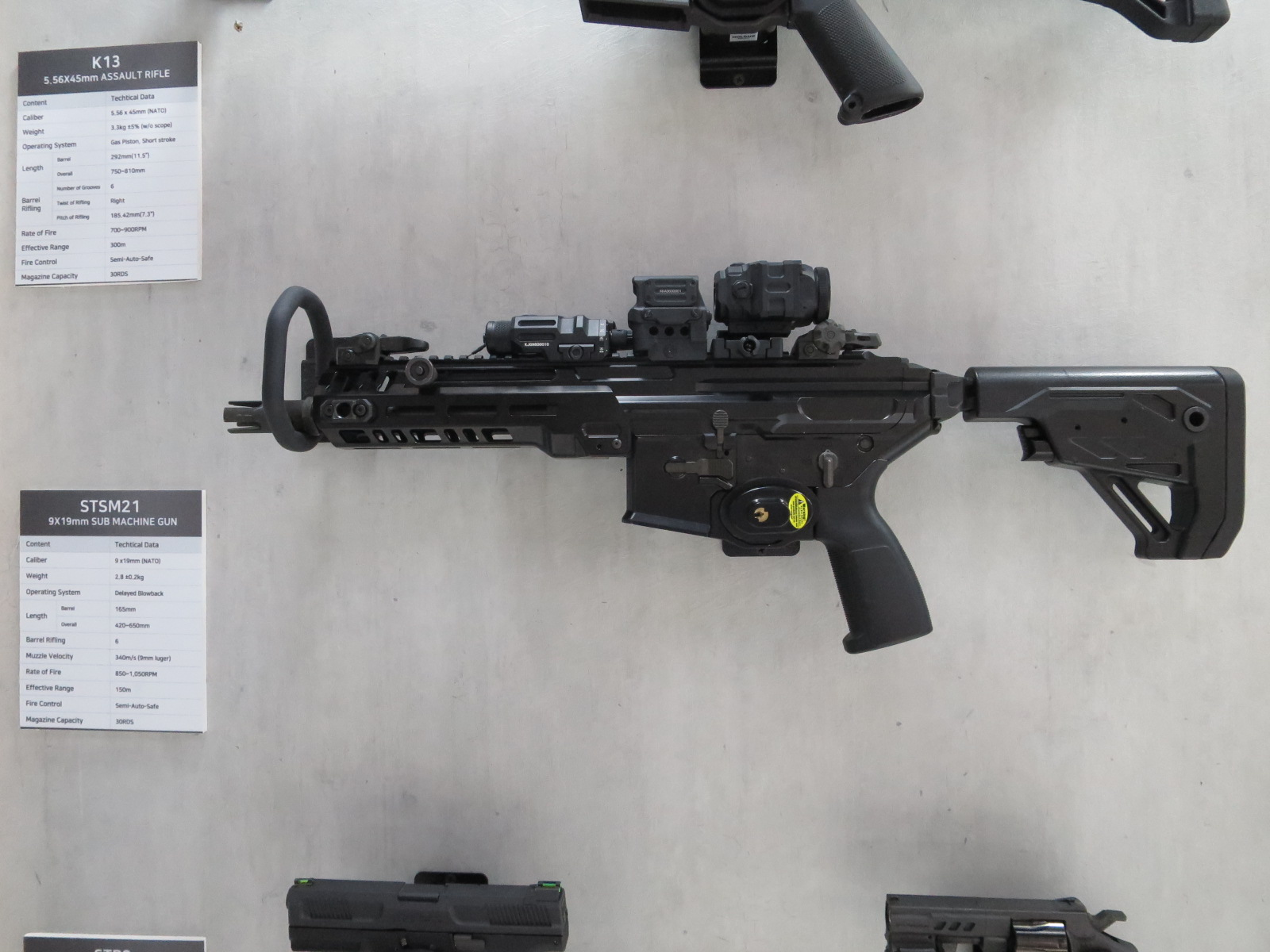
STSM21 at IDEX 2025

=== Own designs ===
- K1 assault carbine/submachine gun (.223 Remington)
- K2 assault rifle (5.56×45mm NATO)
- K3 light machine gun (5.56×45mm NATO)
- K4 automatic grenade launcher (40×53mm)
- K5 semi-automatic pistol (9×19mm Parabellum)
- K7 suppressed submachine gun (9×19mm Parabellum)
- K11 assault rifle/grenade launcher multi-weapon (5.56×45mm NATO & 20×30mm) (cancelled)
- K13 carbine (5.56×45mm NATO), formerly STC-16 (Science & Technology Carbine-16)
- K17 carbine (5.56×45mm NATO), updated version of K13 carbine
- K14 bolt action sniper rifle (.308 Winchester)
- K15 light machine gun (5.56×45mm NATO)
- K16 general-purpose machine gun (7.62×51mm NATO), formerly S&T Motiv K12
- STG40 40 mm under-barrel grenade launcher
- STSM21 submachine gun (9×19mm Parabellum)
- STSR20 semi-automatic sniper rifle (12.7×99mm NATO)
- STSR23 semi-automatic sniper rifle (7.62×51mm NATO)
- STRV9 less lethal revolver (9×19mm Parabellum)
- USAS-12 automatic combat shotgun (12-gauge)
- XK8 prototype bullpup assault rifle (5.56×45mm NATO)
- XK9 prototype submachine gun (9×19mm Parabellum)
- XK10 prototype submachine gun (9×19mm Parabellum)

=== Licensed production ===
- F90 assault rifle (5.56×45mm NATO)
- M16A1 assault rifle (5.56×45mm NATO)
- M1911 semi-automatic pistol (.45 ACP)
- M203 under-barrel grenade launcher, as the K201, with minor improvements (40×46mm)
- M60D general-purpose machine gun (7.62×51mm NATO)

=== Others ===
- KP52 (Clone of Walther PPK)

== See also ==
- SNT Dynamics

== Bibliography ==
- Hogg, Ian V. (1994). Jane's Infantry Weapons, 1994-95. Jane's Information Group. ISBN 978-0710611598.
