= S&T Motiv K16 =

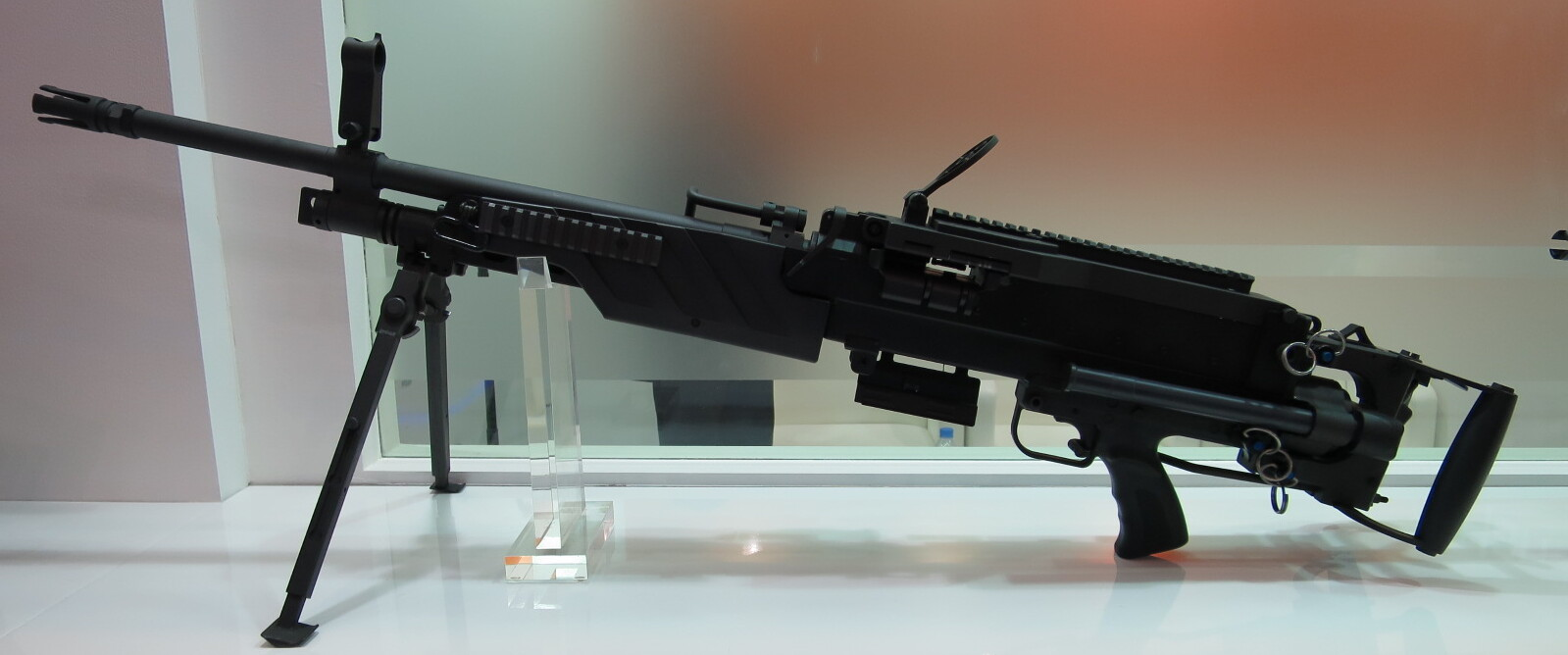
- S&T Motiv K12 (K16D) on display at IDEX 2015
- Type: General purpose machine gun (K16 & K16D); Coaxial machine gun (K16E)
- Place of origin: South Korea

Service history
- In service: 2021–present
- Used by: See Users

Production history
- Designer: S&T Motiv
- Designed: 2010–2012
- Manufacturer: SNT Motiv
- Produced: 2021–present

Specifications
- Mass: K16: 10.4 kg (23 lb) (w/o scope); 2.4 kg (5.3 lb) (quick change barrel) K16D: 12 kg (26 lb) K16E: 11 kg (24 lb)
- Length: 1,256 mm (49.4 in) (extended); 1,196 mm (47.1 in) (retracted)
- Barrel length: 559 mm (22.0 in)
- Cartridge: 7.62×51mm NATO
- Action: Gas-operated, rotating bolt
- Rate of fire: 650–950 rounds/min
- Effective firing range: 800–1,100 m (870–1,200 yd) (point target); 1,800 m (2,000 yd) (area target)
- Maximum firing range: 3,725 m (4,074 yd)
- Feed system: Disintegrating M13 belt

S&T Motiv K16, formerly known as S&T Motiv K12, is a 7.62×51mm NATO general-purpose machine gun manufactured by S&T Motiv to replace the M60 machine gun for the Republic of Korea Armed Forces. The XK12 was first shown to the public in 2009, during the Seoul ADEX International Aerospace and Defense Exhibition. It was officially designated as K12 during the development stage, but it was re-designated as K16 as the mass production process began in 2021.

The K16 has been introduced and used as the standard-issued machine gun of the ROK Armed Forces since December 2021.

== History ==
During the Vietnam War, considerable numbers of South Korean military personnel were deployed to the country in support of the United States military. The U.S. supplied South Korean troops with M60 machine guns, which were quickly adopted and then manufactured under license by Daewoo Precision Industries (now SNT Motiv). From 1970 to 1990, the M60 was South Korea's universal machine gun, being used by infantry and mounted on vehicles and helicopters. Because the Republic of Korea armed forces was heavily influenced by American military doctrine, when the U.S. Army adopted the M249 squad automatic weapon in the 1980s, the South Korean Army and Marine Corps followed suit and introduced the K3 light machine gun, a "Koreanized" version of the FN Minimi, for squad use. During the 2000s when aging M60s first needed replacement, platoon-level machine guns were replaced by K3s which removed the medium machine gun from infantry, a departure from U.S. doctrine which uses medium machine guns for platoon-level fire support. The M60 remained in use on vehicles and aircraft, but even some Korean-made armored vehicles were armed only with K3s.

Since the K3 was in production while M60 assembly lines had long been closed, it seemed obvious to the ROK military to replace the M60 with it. However, due to the short range and limited power of the 5.56 NATO round, South Korean tanks, armored cars, and helicopters retained their M60 variants firing 7.62 NATO ammunition. Most M60s were still working relatively well and the military did not want to spend money to find a replacement machine gun, choosing to use their budget to focus on more expensive and high-value assets. The search for a new medium machine gun finally gathered momentum in 2006 when the ROK Army began the development of the Korean Utility Helicopter, a domestic medium utility helicopter. The new helicopter created a requirement for new machine guns for them, as both the UH-1H Hueys and the M60s they mounted remained from the Vietnam War. Army leaders initially wanted to buy from foreign vendors, especially the FN Herstal M240H, but others in the Army and S&T Motiv (now SNT Motiv) used the opportunity to develop an indigenous 7.62 mm machine gun.

S&T Motiv began development under the name XK12 in July 2010. By the time gun prototypes began to be mounted and tested on KUH helicopter prototypes, they had already fired 300,000 rounds without any serious problems. In 2012, the XK12 was adopted as the K12 light machine gun as the standard armament of the KUH. At first, the K12 was only in use for the 300 planned helicopters, but there was potential to expand its use. The ROK Army has 2,300 tanks each usually having two M60 guns, and a similar number of other vehicles armed with one M60. Furthermore, U.S. experiences in Iraq and Afghanistan have soldiers desiring medium machine guns to return to infantry outfits. Large orders may later open up export markets. In October 2020, the ROK armed forces declared the K12 to be the standard 7.62 mm machine gun in the South Korean Armed Forces and that it would be delivered to infantry units of the South Korean Army to replace the M60D in vehicle and aircraft-mounted roles.

The K12, which was released in 2012, was re-designated as the K16 after undergoing improvement after being judged unfit for combat by the Defense Acquisition Program Administration, and mass production began after the end of field testing in 2021. Since mass production began, the K16 has been introduced to the ROK Armed Forces since December 2021 and has been serviced as a standard machine gun, while the K3 and M60s that are previously owned will be replaced by the K16 sequentially.

== Design ==
The K16 is based on the K3's design, layout, and function using a gas piston and rotating bolt. It is fed through a STANAG M13 disintegrating belt link and cannot accept a magazine. The cross-bolt type safety is the same as K3/Minimi, and the receiver is made from steel press with an aluminum alloy feed cover. Although similar in design, the receiver and other important parts are enlarged to accommodate the larger round.

The K16D (formerly K12) is somewhat heavy for the gun class at 12 kg (26 lb), mainly because it has pistol grip, spade grip, and metal sliding stock all in one gun for the purpose of being quickly converted into a ground-fire machine gun by a dismounted operator; the spade grip can be removed by taking out two pins, removing the grip, and unfolding the stock which is similar in design to the FN Minimi's Para version. Standard machine gun features are included like a folding (K3-style) bipod, quick change barrel, gas regulator, and (M240H-style) flash suppressor. It also has a folding ring sight for firing on helicopters with a folding ladder type sight for more accurate aiming.

The sight is attached on a MIL-STD 1913 rail, which is also on the feed cover and both sides of the handguard. No laser or optical sight has yet been selected for use on the K16, but some kind of electro-optical accessories are expected in the near future.

In 2015, S&T Motiv unveiled the XK-12C1 (now K16E), a coaxial machine gun version of the K12 with a heavier barrel and solenoid trigger. It is designed to fill the role of the M60C coaxial gun mounted on many vehicles, as they are nearing their operational age limit and will soon need replacement.

== Gallery ==
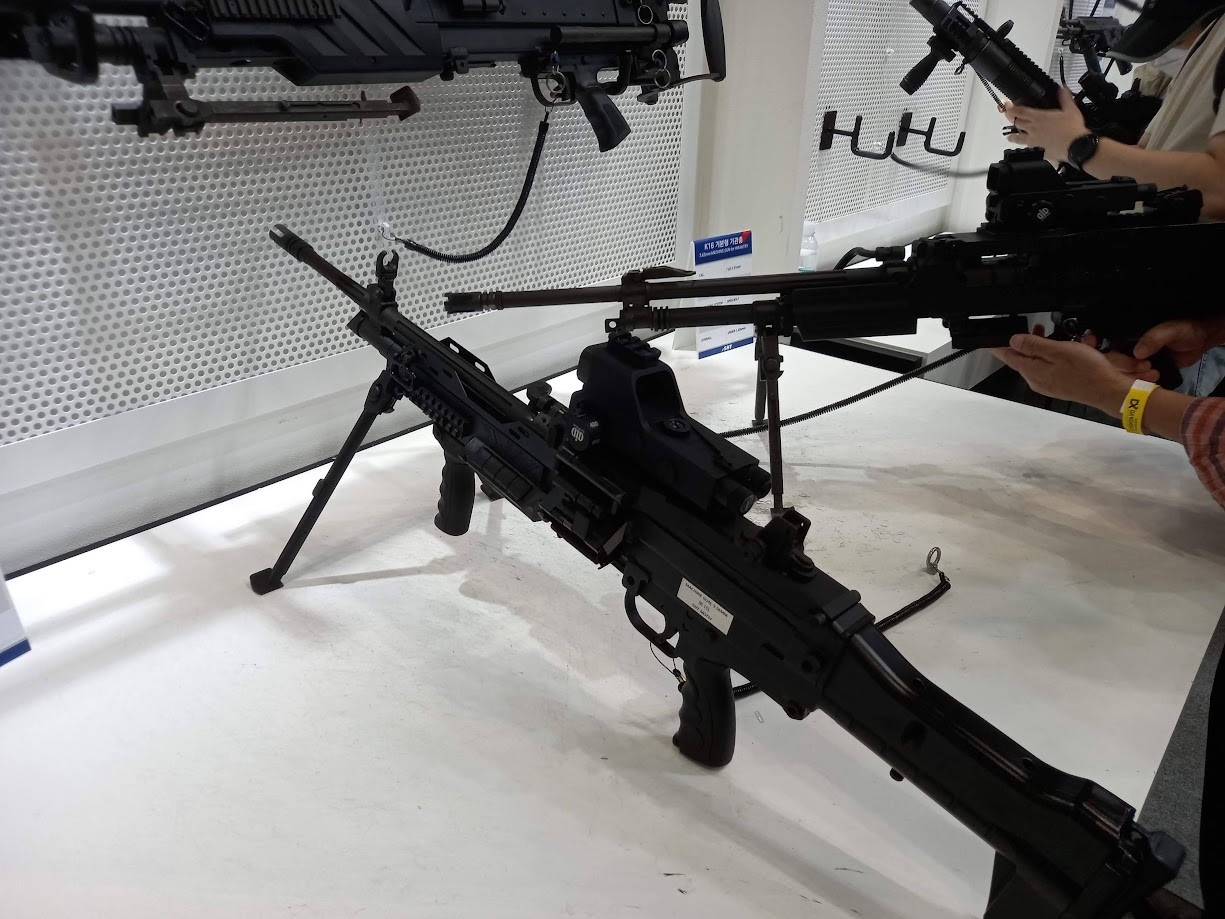
K16 standard version, equipped with hand foregrip and holographic sight.

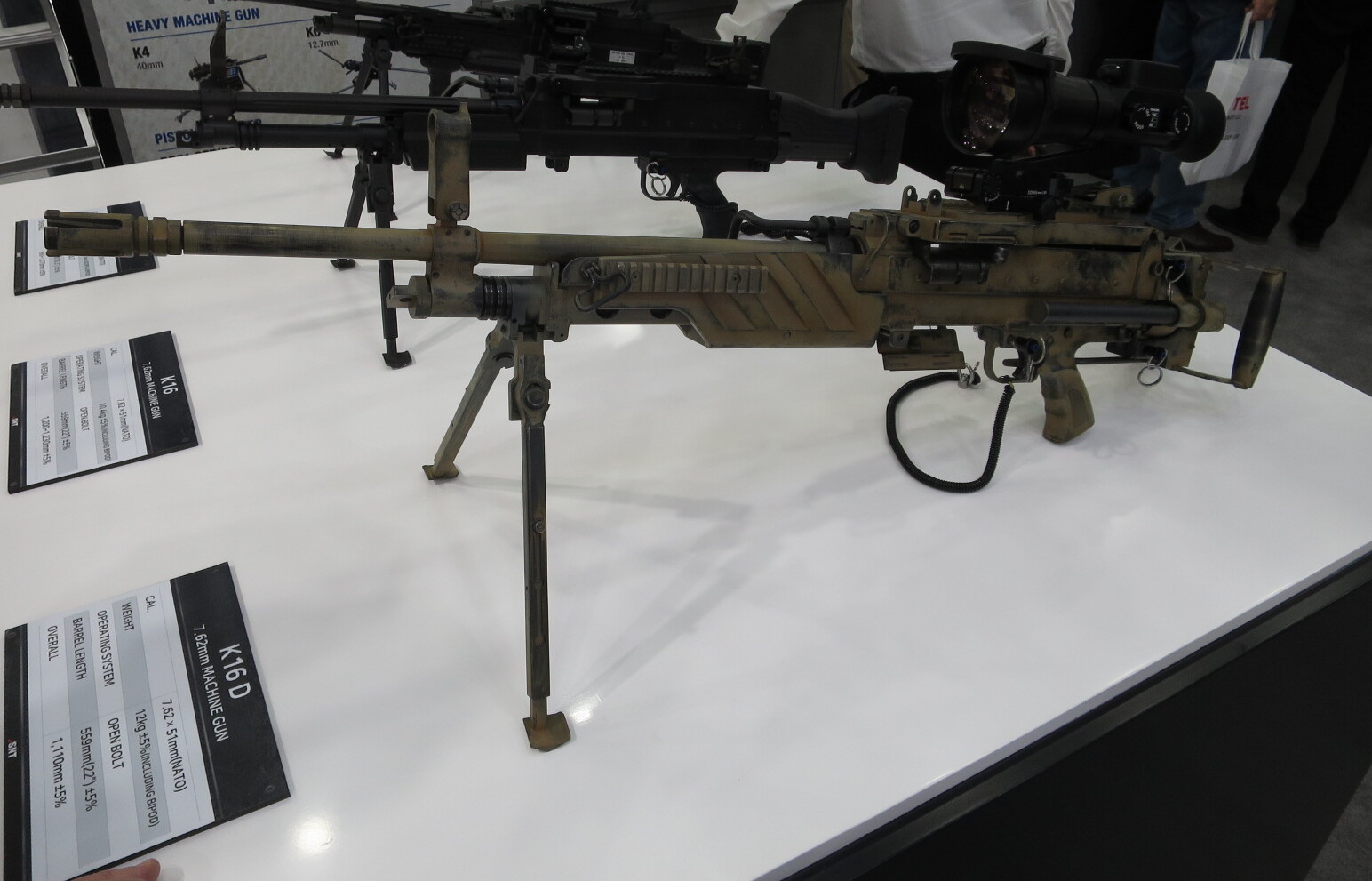
K16D with tan parts. Equipped with an optical sight

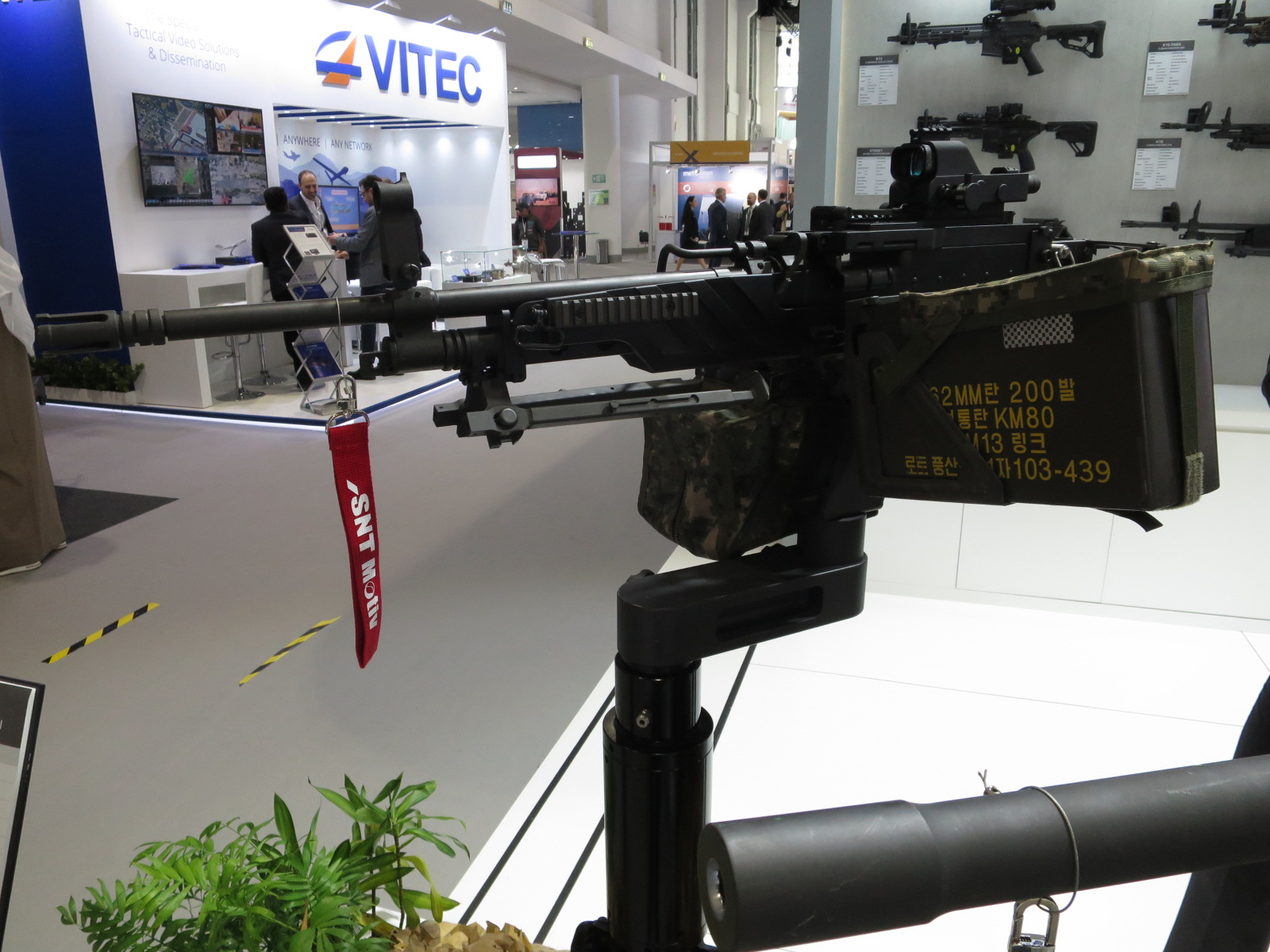
K16D in both land and air vehicles mode. This model is equipped with a folding bipod and mounted optical sight.

== Users ==
- Philippines: Acquired by Philippine National Police in 2018 for the Special Action Force.
- Poland: Used only as a coaxial on K2 tanks.
- South Korea

=== Potential users ===
- India: Indian Army representatives visited S&T Motiv to potentially consider purchasing the K-12 in 2019.
