= S&T Motiv K14 =

Sniper rifle

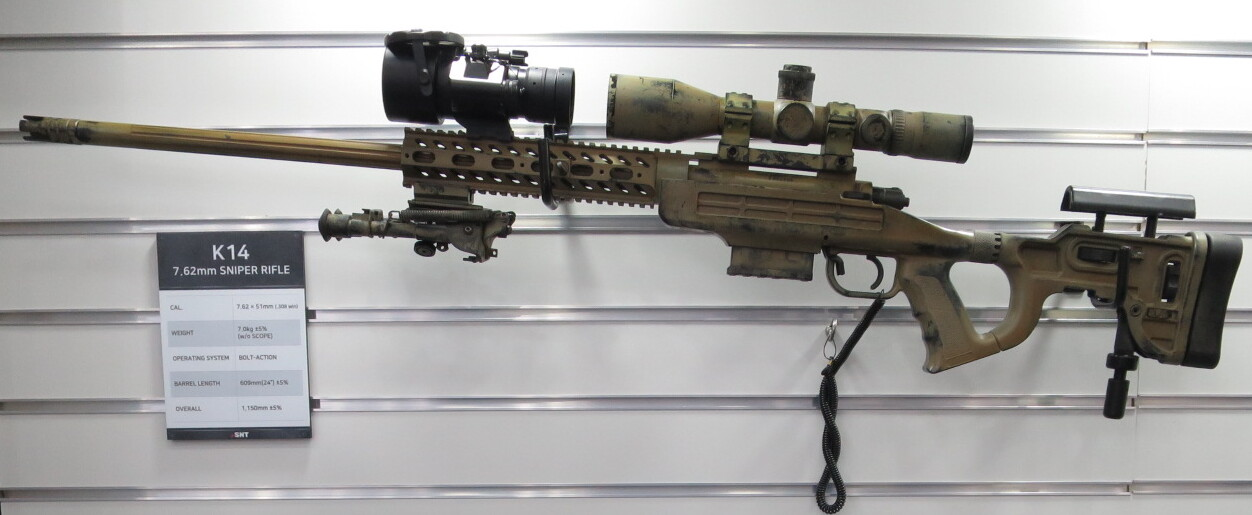
- S&T Motiv K14
- Type: Sniper rifle
- Place of origin: South Korea

Service history
- In service: 2012–present
- Used by: See Users

Production history
- Designer: S&T Motiv
- Designed: 2011–2012
- Manufacturer: S&T Motiv (2012–2021); SNT Motiv (2021–present)
- Produced: 2012–present

Specifications
- Mass: 5.5 kg (12 lb) (w/o sight & magazine); 7 kg (15 lb) (w/ sight & empty magazine)
- Length: 1,150 mm (45 in)
- Barrel length: 609.6 mm (24.00 in)
- Cartridge: .308 Winchester
- Action: Bolt-action
- Effective firing range: 800 m (870 yd)
- Feed system: Standard: 5-round magazine Optional: 10-round magazine
- Sights: Schmidt & Bender PM II (2012–2015); Focus Optech SW-3125 (2015–present)

The S&T Motiv K14 (Korean: 에스앤티모티브 14) is a .308 Winchester bolt-action sniper rifle developed by S&T Motiv, and is the standard sniper rifle of the Republic of Korea Armed Forces.

== History ==
For decades, the South Korean Army did not have a standard-issue sniper rifle. Small numbers of M1C/D Garands were used until they became obsolete in the late 1970s. In the late 1980s, British Trilux-style scopes were fitted to K2 assault rifles. This turned them into designated marksman rifles, but this was not official or widespread. Dedicated foreign-built sniper rifles were bought for special forces and counter-terror units, but the regular army had virtually no interest in sniping. This mindset was unusual, as they had encountered sniper threats during the Korean War and their involvement in the Vietnam War. That began to change after American operations during the Iraq War and the War in Afghanistan. South Korean officers deployed in these combat zones witnessed the effectiveness of both friendly and enemy sharpshooters. This combined with the realization of the capabilities of the sniper force that the North Korean Army maintained, which had large numbers of specially trained and equipped snipers at platoon and even squad level, the ROK Army decided to incorporate the sniper role into its forces.

Requirements for the sniper rifle were completed in 2011 and called for 800–1,000 bolt-action .308 Winchester rifles with optics and accessories. Foreign purchases were allowed, but because South Korean law favors domestic defense manufacturers, S&T Daewoo (now SNT Motiv) submitted their XK14 design and became the prime candidate. The XK14 was in development for two years and underwent a one-year evaluation by the ROK military. After passing tests and certification, the rifle was accepted into service in December 2012 as the ROK Army's first general-issue sniper rifle and officially designated as the K14. S&T Motiv was awarded a 3.2 billion won ($3 million) contract for an unspecified number of rifles. The cost for the individual rifle is unknown, but the package as it is sold to the Army that includes the rifle, daytime scope, night vision sight, ghillie suit, and other accessories costs $13,000. The first examples were handed over to ROK special forces in 2013, with it being distributed to ROKA infantry battalions starting in late 2017, and deliveries being completed in January 2021.

== Design ==
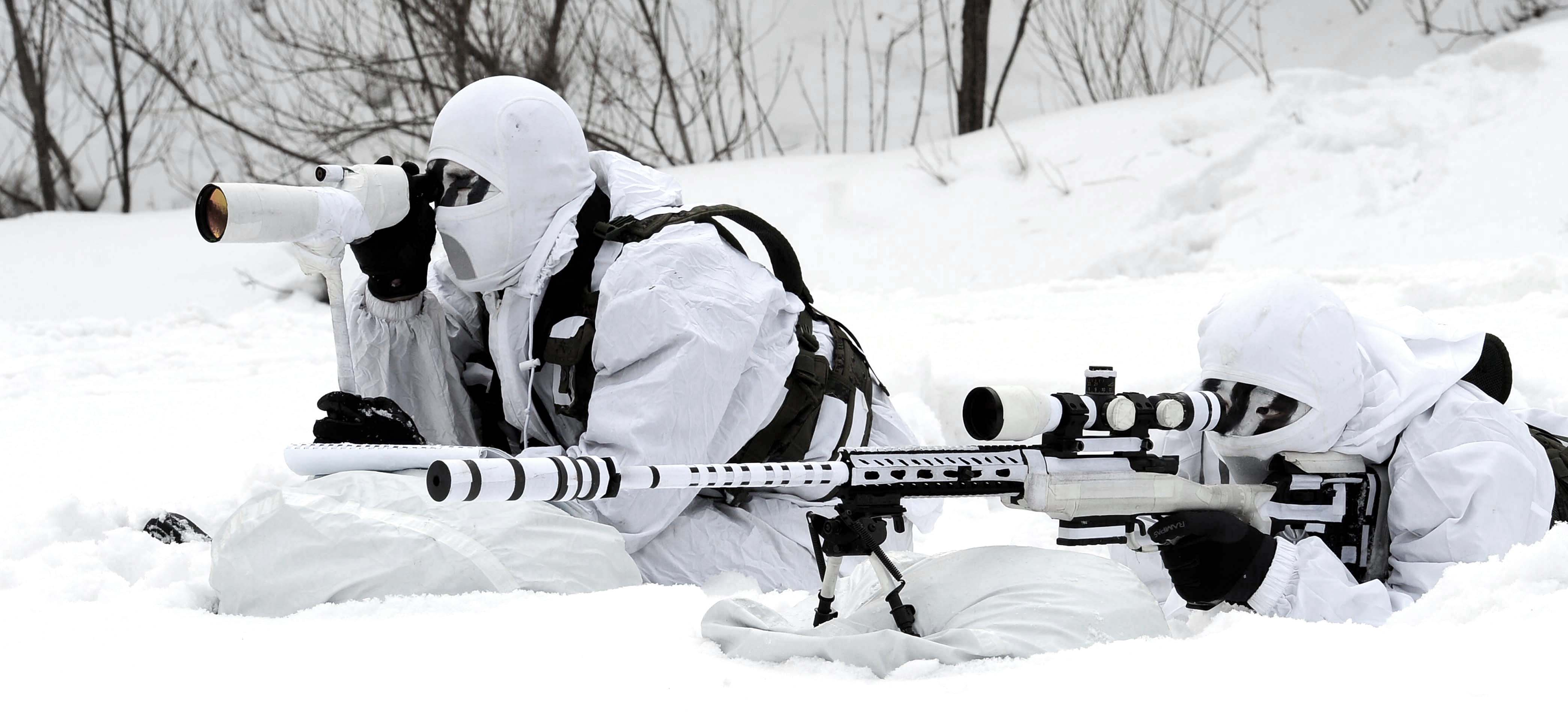
The cold weather K14 sniper rifle training of ROK Army special warfare force

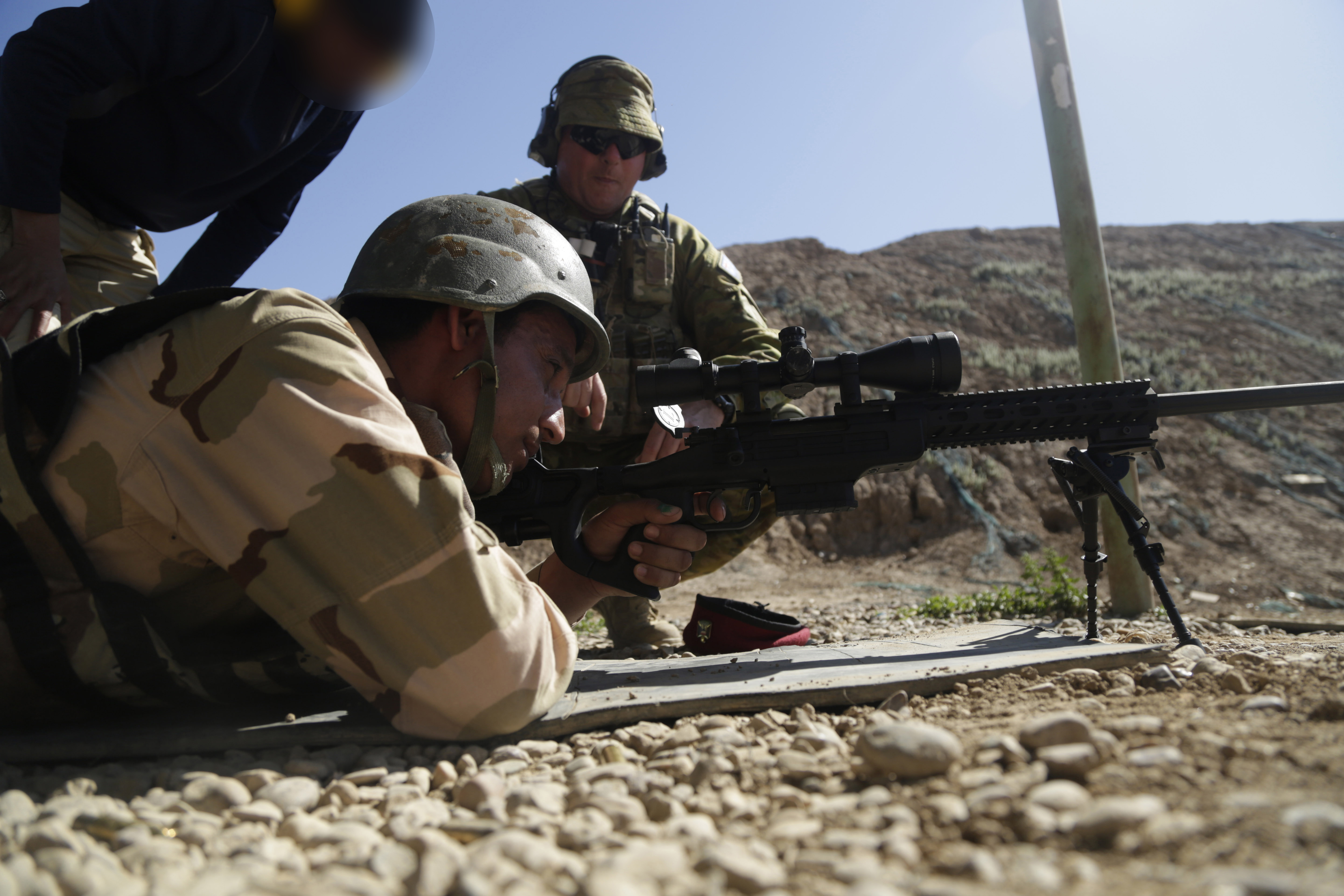
An Iraqi soldier with the Security Battalion, Ninewa Operational Command, prepares to fire a K14 sniper rifle under the supervision of an Australian soldier

The K14 is a bolt-action rifle with a bolt handle that opens at 60 degrees for fast reloading; prototype models had rough bolt movement and triggers, but they were smoothed out in production examples. The K14's bolt-action has some similarities with the Winchester Model 70. The stock is made of fiberglass-reinforced polymer with an adjustable cheek pad and butt plate, along with a height adjustable monopod and thumbhole pistol grip. Its internal frame is metallic and supports a 4-way picatinny rail handguard for accessories. It is also equipped with a bipod. The fluted heavy profile barrel is 609.6 millimeters (24.00 in) long with a four-prong Vortex-style flash suppressor. A sound suppressor was not required, but can be mounted by removing the flash hider. Good quality foreign scopes, like the Schmidt & Bender PMII and Leupold Mk4, are being favored over Korean sights. At 1.15 meters (45 in) long and weighing 5.5 kilograms (12 lb) unloaded without a scope, it is comparatively small and light in relation to its barrel length.

The K14 has a short receiver chambered for the .308 Winchester round, as was strictly required. Additional funds were not spent to allow for a possible future conversion to a larger caliber like .300 Winchester Magnum or .338 Lapua Magnum. It is fed by a detachable magazine, with standard capacity at 5 rounds. A larger capacity 10-round magazine is also available. The rifle is accurate to 1 MOA out to 100 yards (91 m), and has an effective range of 800 meters (870 yd).

Since 2015, S&T Motiv has been introducing new features to the K14 including Korean-made Focus Optech SW-3125 optics and detachable side rails to replace German Schmidt & Bender PM optics.

Hanwha Systems developed a multifunctional observation device that is part of the K14 package. The observation device features a built-in telescope, thermal imaging camera, laser rangefinder, electronic compass, and GPS. It can spot a person from a distance of up to 2.5 kilometers (1.6 mi) using the daytime telescope and up to 1.5 kilometers (0.93 mi) using the thermal camera.

== Export ==
The K14 is being offered to the Jordanian Army. S&T Motiv also claims that small amounts have already been sold to foreign buyers.

== Users ==
- South Korea: Standard-issued sniper rifle.
- Iraq: Used by Special Forces.
- Jordan: Used by Jordanian Armed Forces
