= S&T Daewoo XK9 =

- Type: Submachine gun
- Place of origin: South Korea

Service history
- In service: None
- Used by: n/a

Production history
- Designer: S&T Daewoo
- Designed: 2003-04
- Manufacturer: S&T Daewoo
- Produced: 2003-04 (Supposed date)
- No. built: Preproduction prototypes only
- Variants: XK9C

Specifications
- Mass: XK9: 2.90 kg (empty); XK10: 2.80 kg (empty)
- Length: XK9: 680 mm (extended); XK10: 590 mm (extended); XK9: 438 mm (folded); XK10: 348 mm (folded)
- Barrel length: XK9: 220 mm XK10: 134 mm
- Cartridge: 9×19mm Parabellum
- Caliber: 9mm
- Action: blowback
- Rate of fire: 980 rounds/min
- Muzzle velocity: XK9: 380 m/s XK10: 350 m/s
- Effective firing range: XK9: 150 m XK10: 100 m
- Feed system: 30-round magazine
- Sights: rail mount

The S&T Daewoo XK9 is a 9×19mm submachine gun manufactured by S&T Daewoo. It was to be used along the Heckler & Koch MP5 in ROK military special forces, but was not adopted. According to Jane's, the weapon was supposedly manufactured in 2003 and had the designation DS9A. The XK9 can be mass-produced if there is demand for it.

== Design ==
The XK9 was based on the K2 rifle, but uses a folding skeleton polymer stock.

== Variants ==
The only known variant is the Daewoo XK10, which has a shorter length by 590 mm with its extended stock and 348 mm if the stock is folded. In addition, it has a barrel length of 134 mm.

== Bibliography ==
- Jones, Richard D.; White, Andrew (June 2008), Jane's Guns Recognition Guide, 5th edition, London, England: Harper Collins, ISBN 978-0-06-137408-1
- Jones, Richard D.; Ness, Leland S., eds. (2010). Jane's Infantry Weapons 2010-2011. Jane's Publishing. ISBN 978-0710629081.
