= Daewoo Precision Industries K5 =

Semi-automatic pistol

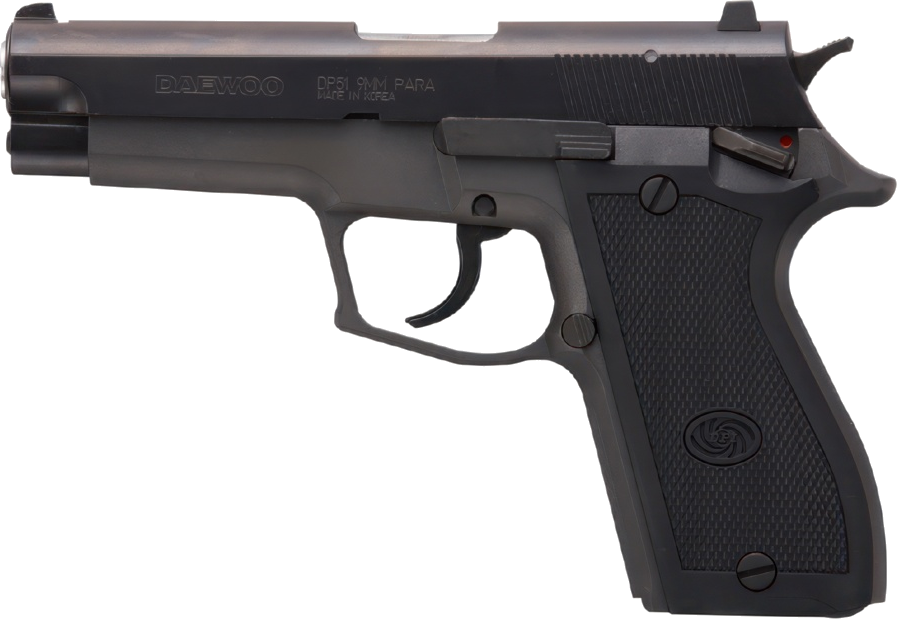
- Daewoo K5
- Type: Semi-automatic pistol
- Place of origin: South Korea

Service history
- In service: 1989–present
- Used by: See Users
- Wars: Global War on Terrorism; Iraq War

Production history
- Designer: Daewoo Precision Industries
- Designed: 1984–1988
- Manufacturer: Daewoo Precision Industries (1981-1999); Daewoo Telecom (1999-2002); Daewoo Precision (2002-2006); S&T Daewoo (2006-2012); S&T Motiv (2012-2021); SNT Motiv (2021-present)
- Produced: 1989–present
- Variants: See Variants

Specifications
- Mass: 734 g (25.9 oz) DP51; 751 g (26.5 oz) DP51 MKII; 686 g (24.2 oz) DP51C
- Length: 178 mm (7.0 in) DP51 (MKII); 177.8 mm (7.0 in) DP51C
- Barrel length: 104.14 mm (4.1 in)DP51 (MKII); 91.14 mm (3.6 in) DP51C
- Width: 33.5 mm (1.3 in)
- Height: 125 mm (4.9 in) DP51 (MKII); 118 mm (4.6 in) DP51C
- Cartridge: 9×19mm Parabellum
- Caliber: 9 mm
- Action: Tilting Barrel Short Recoil
- Effective firing range: 50 m (55 yd)
- Feed system: 13- or 15-round magazine DP51 (MKII); 10-round magazine DP51C; Also accepts 10-, 13-, 14- or 15-round S&W 5906 magazines, but they will protrude out from the magazine well.
- Sights: Iron sights

The Daewoo Precision Industries K5 or K5/DP51 series is a 9×19mm semi-automatic pistol produced by SNT Motiv (formerly S&T Daewoo) of South Korea.

The K5 was introduced in 1989. It is recoil operated and uses a conventional Browning-type locking system. It is mostly carried by commissioned officers in the South Korean military.

== Design ==
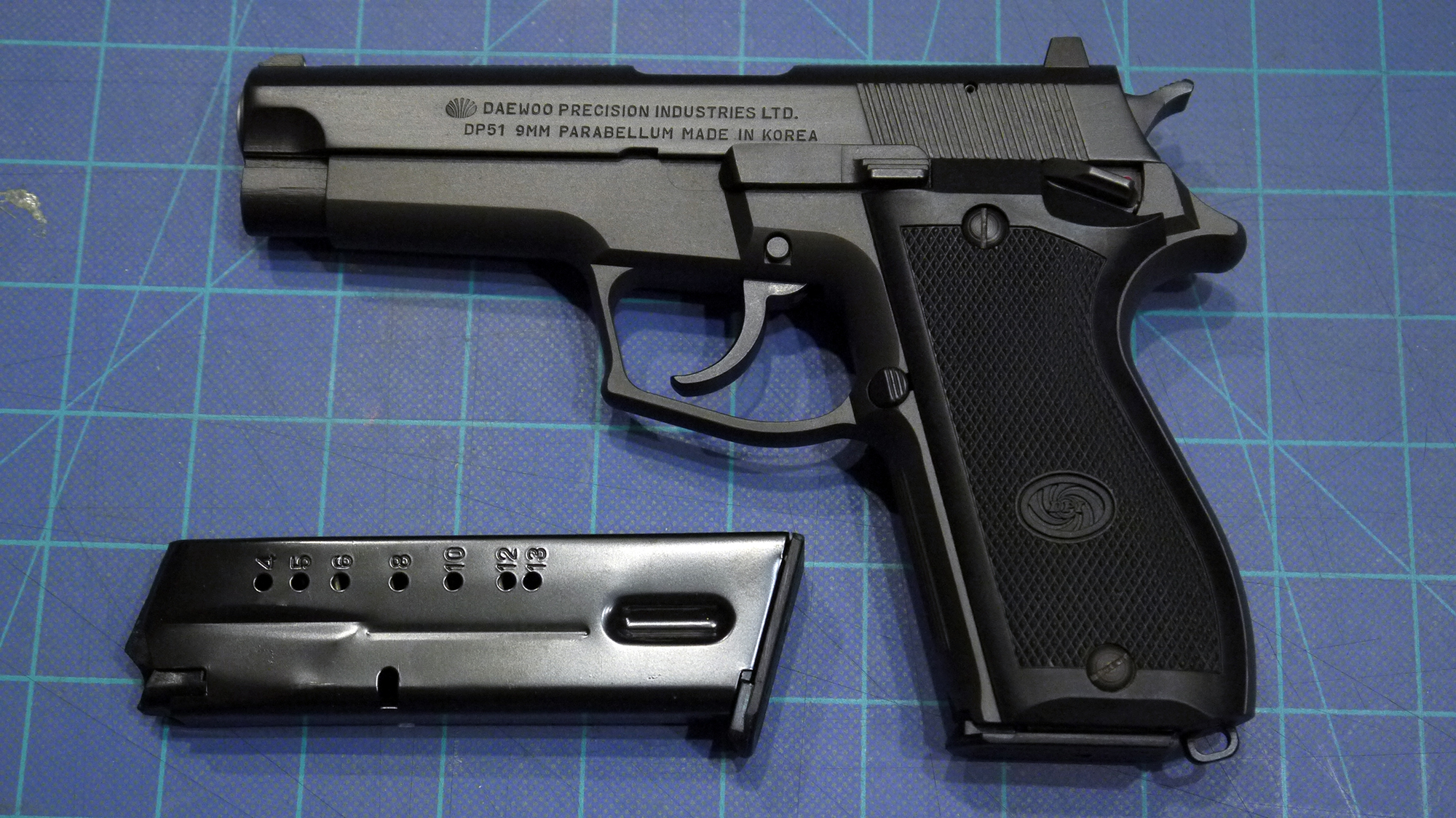
A commercial DP51 version of the K5 9mm service pistol

The K5 is a compact, lightweight pistol with an unconventional trigger mechanism called "fast action". The frame is made of forged 7075-T6 aluminum alloy with a matte anodized finish, while the slide is constructed out of forged 4140 steel with a matte finish. The barrel is made of forged 4150 steel with a 104.14 mm (4.1 in) (6 grooves) right twist.

The "fast action" trigger mechanism allows the hammer to be decocked while still keeping the mainspring compressed. The "fast action" (commonly referred to as "Triple Action", and most recently called "Double Action Plus" by Lionheart Industries) mode allows the trigger travel of the double-action mode with the trigger weight of single-action mode. This allows a more accurate first shot due to the lighter weight of the trigger. It is also safer due to the longer trigger travel required to fire the pistol. A light pull on the trigger causes the hammer to flick back, after which the pistol would behave in conventional single-action mode. The pistol can also be fired in traditional double and single-action modes.

The factory double-column type box magazines hold 13 or 15 rounds for the full size variant or for the compact variant 10 rounds. Smith & Wesson 59-series magazines are known to be compatible with the DP51 but will protrude slightly. The magazine release is of the push button type.

The pistol has three-dot iron sights. The safety consists of an ambidextrous safety external safety and a passive firing pin block which (as its name implies) blocks the firing pin from moving forward unless the trigger is pulled.

The handgrip panels are made of one piece polymer.

== Commercial sales ==
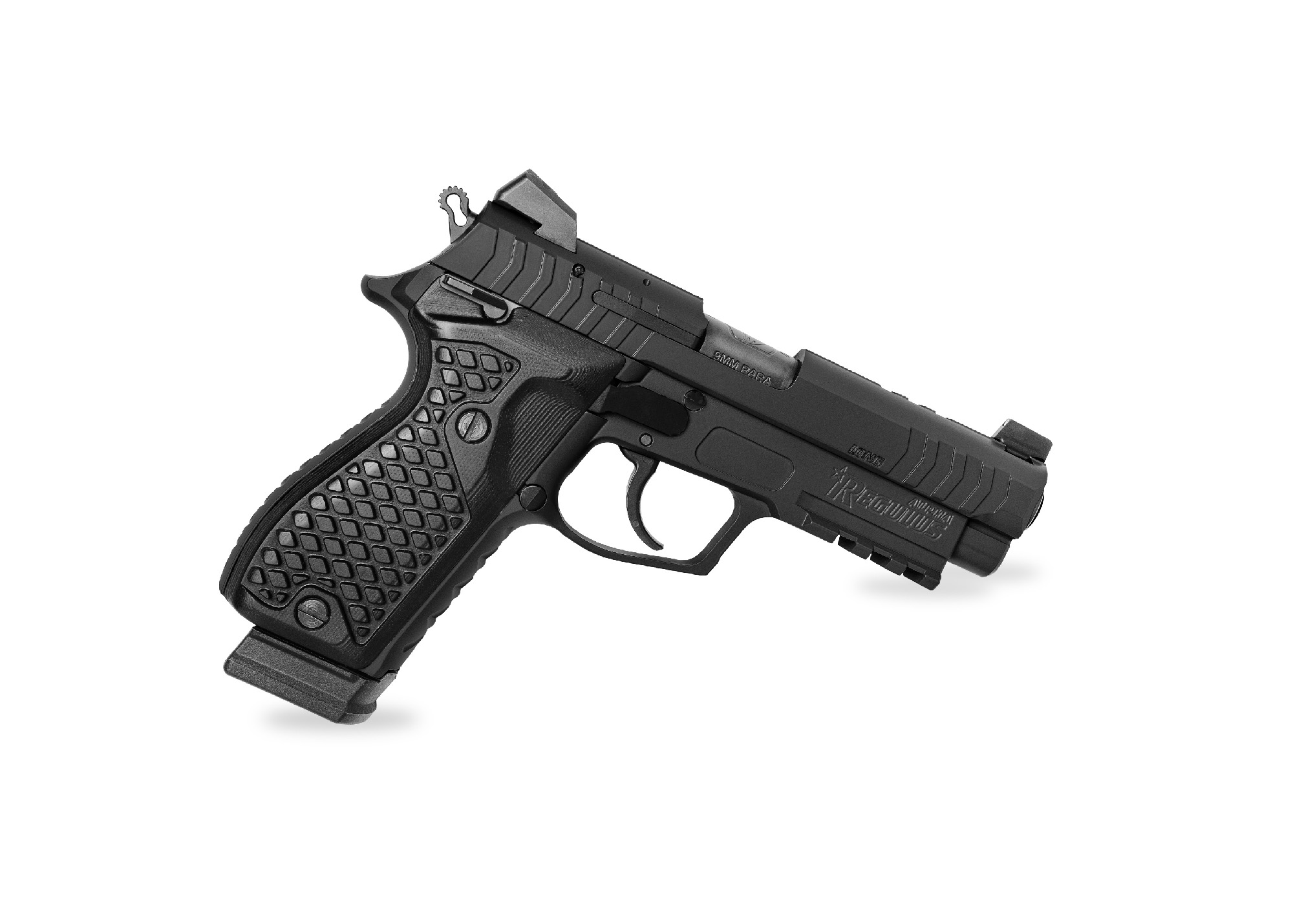
Lionheart Industries REGULUS Blackout Alpha pistol.

The K5 was marketed commercially in the United States from around 1990 to 1997 through various importers, including FirstShot, Inc., Kimber of America, Inc., B-West Imports, Inc., and Davidsons, Inc. as the DP51, with a compact version known as the DP51C and .40 S&W caliber version known as the DH40.

It wasn't until 2012 that the K5/DP51 was reintroduced to the U.S. civilian market through collaboration between Daewoo Precision Industries (at that point having been renamed to SNT Motiv) and Lionheart Industries of Redmond, Washington as the LH9, LH9C, and LH9 MKII (amongst other variants). The LH9 is essentially a DP51 with some cosmetic differences and improved features, such as a redesigned hammer, wider slide serrations, added serrations to the front of the slide, redesigned grips and multi-color option Cerakote finish. Lionheart also imported a version of the design with a built-in Picatinny rail under the name "LH9 MKII". The internal design and basic functions remain identical to the original and all the parts interchange between the K5/DP51 and the LH9. Unlike the 13-round Daewoo magazines, Lionheart magazines are 15-round Mec-Gar S&W 59 magazines with an extended baseplate so they will fit flush.

In 2016, Lionheart moved from importing the guns to manufacturing improved versions under license in Renton, Washington, renaming them the "Regulus". Improvements for the Regulus line included Novak sights, heavily textured grips, more aggressive slide serrations, titanium-nitride barrels with single-point machining, jagged front strap serrations, finger-rests on the frame and a Picatinny rail on all guns and an optional threaded barrel. In 2020, Lionheart Industries was sold to a new American buyer, and manufacturing was moved to Winder, Georgia.

In 2023, Lionheart retired the Regulus line and replaced it with the "Vulcan", an improved version of the Regulus. For the Vulcan, further refinements were made to the pistol including an optic cut, a redesign of the extractor, redesign of the recoil spring assembly, a fiber-optic front sight, G10 grips and Cerekote Elite finish. In October of 2025, Lionheart Industries announced that they were going out of business and production of the Vulcan would cease at the end of the year.

At the SHOT Show in early 2025, a surprise announcement was made by SNT Defense, a subsidiary of SNT Motiv, that the company was preparing to resume importation of various sought-after Daewoo products, including the K2 rifle and DP51 pistol. The company has set up an assembly section in Las Vegas, Nevada so that parts can be imported from South Korea while manufacturing essential parts in the United States to maintain 922r compliance In July 2025, SNT Defense provided an update that they hope to sell the new production DP51s for an MSRP of $499.

== Variants ==
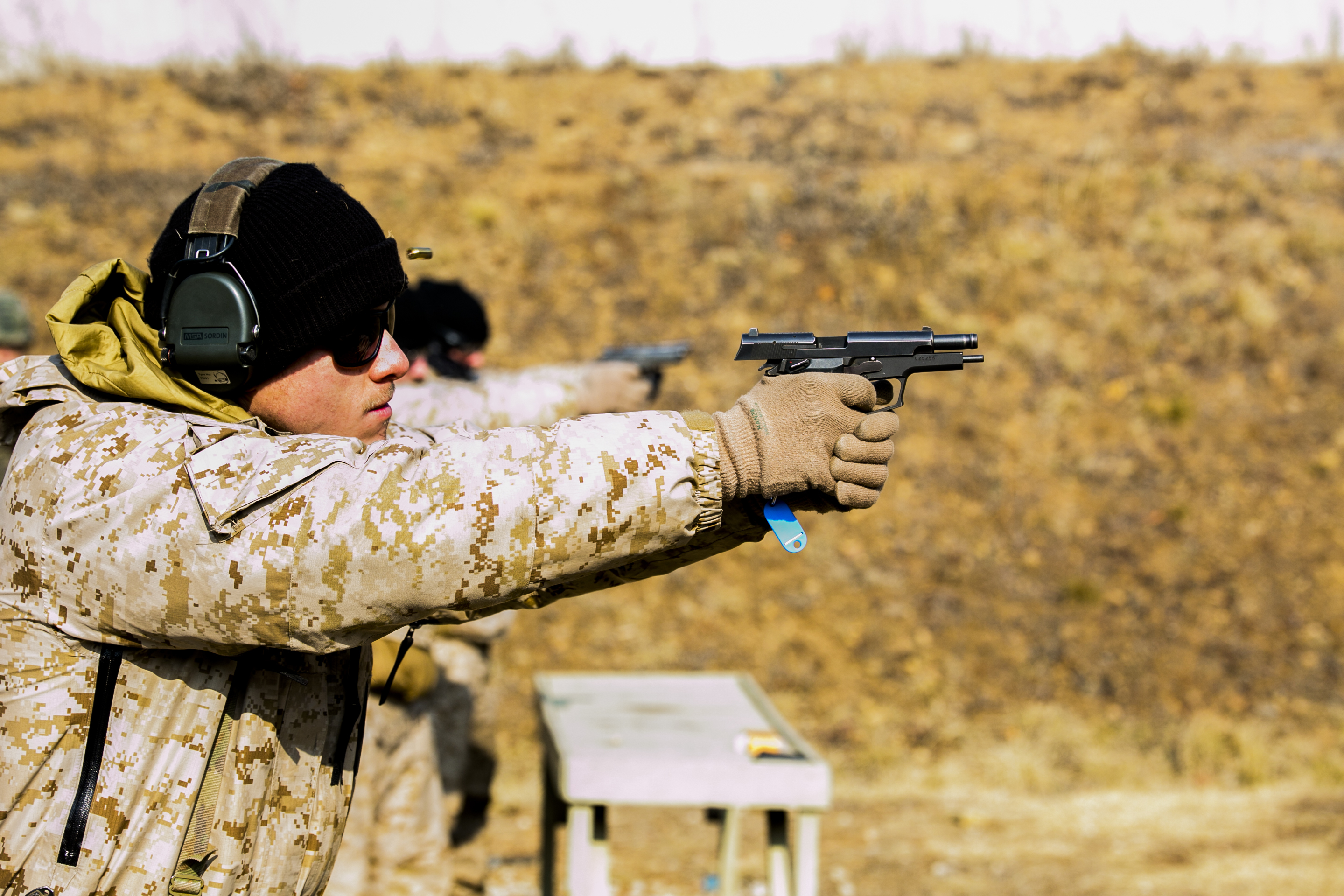
A U.S. Marine is firing a K5 during a ROK-U.S. Marine Exchange Program in Gimpo, South Korea.

- XK5: Experimental prototype.
- K5: Standard mass-produced variant.
  - DP51: Commercial version of K5.
    - DP51S: Semi-compact version with compact slide and full-sized frame.
    - DP51C: Compact version of DP51.
    - DP51 MK II: Modernized version of DP51.
  - DH40: Commercial version of K5 chambered in .40 S&W.
  - DH45: Commercial version of K5 chambered in .45 ACP.
  - LH9: Updated Version of the DP51 introduced by Lionheart Industries in 2011.
    - LH9C: Compact version of the LH9.
    - LH9 MKII: LH9 equipped with integral picatinny rail.
  - REGULUS: Updated version of LH9
    - REGULUS Alpha: Full size pistol
    - REGULUS Beta: Compact pistol

== Users ==
- Guatemala: Purchased in 2011.
- Indonesia: Purchased in 2011.
- South Korea: Standard sidearm.
- Singapore: Singapore Armed Forces Commando Formation (CDO FN)
- North Macedonia: Macedonia Armed Forces
- Thailand: 200 K5s transferred according to a 2019 SIPRI small arms report.

== Bibliography ==
- Southby-Tailyour, Ewen (2005). Jane's Special Forces Recognition Guide. London: Janes. ISBN 978-0-00-718329-6.
- Hogg, Ian (2000). Jane's Guns Recognition Guide Second Edition. Glasgow: Janes. ISBN 978-0-00-472453-9.
