= Daewoo Precision Industries K1 =

South Korean assault rifle

Daewoo Precision Industries K1A
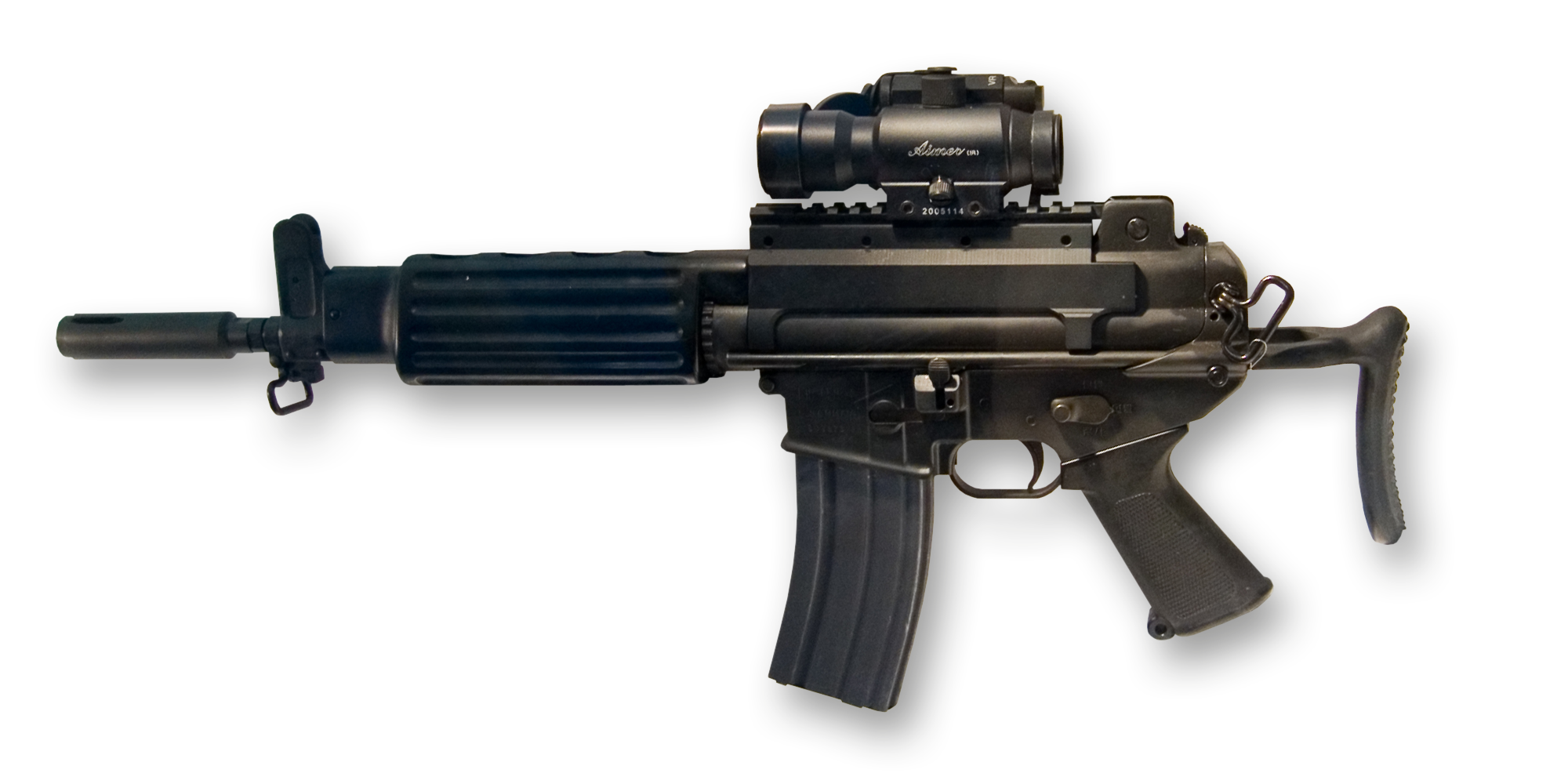
- Daewoo Precision Industries K1A
- Type: Assault rifle Carbine
- Place of origin: South Korea

Service history
- In service: 1981–present
- Used by: See Users
- Wars: Persian Gulf War; War in Afghanistan; Iraq War; 1992 Los Angeles Riots

Production history
- Designer: Agency for Defense Development; Daewoo Precision Industries
- Designed: 1977–1982
- Manufacturer: Arsenal of National Defense (1980–1981); Daewoo Precision Industries (1981–1999); Daewoo Telecom (1999–2002); Daewoo Precision (2002–2006); S&T Daewoo (2006–2012); S&T Motiv (2012–2021); SNT Motiv (2021–present); Dasan Machineries (2016–present)
- Produced: 1980–present
- No. built: 180,000
- Variants: See Variants

Specifications
- Mass: 2.87 kg (6.3 lb) (w/o magazine)
- Length: 838 mm (33.0 in) (stock extended); 653 mm (25.7 in) (stock retracted)
- Barrel length: 263 mm (10.4in)
- Cartridge: .223 Remington (pre 2014 production); 5.56×45mm NATO (post 2014 production)
- Caliber: 5.56 mm
- Action: Gas-operated, rotating bolt (direct impingement)
- Rate of fire: 750–900 rounds/min
- Muzzle velocity: 820 m/s (2,700 ft/s) (KM193); 790 m/s (2,600 ft/s) (K100)
- Effective firing range: 250 m (KM193); 400 m (K100)
- Feed system: Various STANAG magazines.
- Sights: Iron sights

The Daewoo Precision Industries K1 is a family of South Korean selective-fire assault rifles developed by Agency for Defense Development (ADD) and manufactured by Daewoo Precision Industries (now SNT Motiv) and Dasan Machineries (since 2016). It entered service in the Republic of Korea Armed Forces in 1981.

Though considered a rifle, the K1 was designated as a submachine gun (기관단총) by the Ministry of National Defense due to the K1 replacing the M3 submachine gun in purpose.

== Development ==
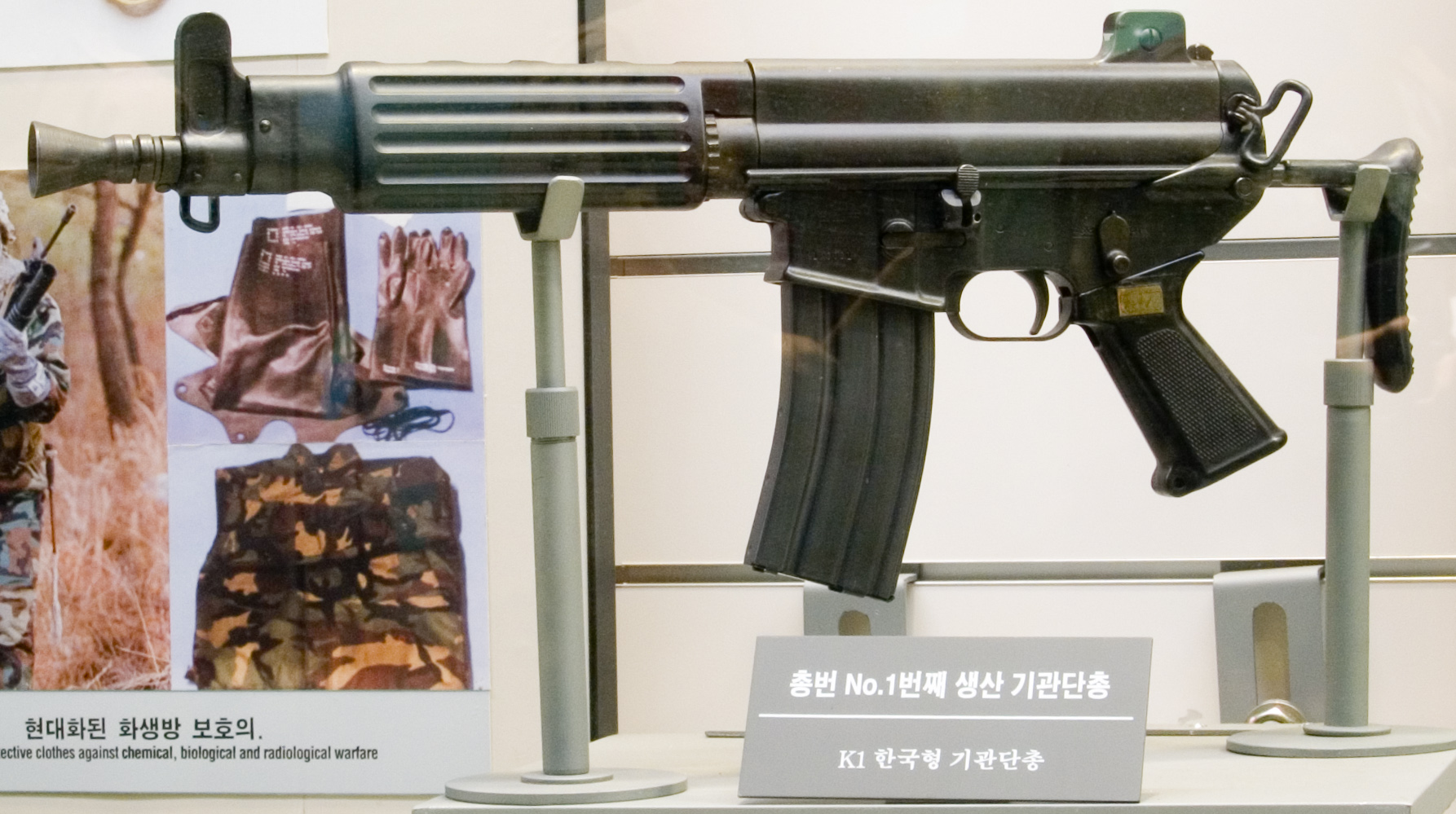
Serial Number 1 K1

In 1976, the ROKA Special Warfare Command requested a new weapon to replace the old M3 submachine gun. In the following year, ADD launched a project derived from the XB rifle, which started in 1972 to replace licensed M16A1s with indigenous weapons. Under the demands of the ROK-SWC, the new weapon must have greater firepower, light weight, cost effectiveness, and easy access to spare parts. The first prototypes were made in 1980, and entered service in 1981 after series of field test.

But due to the design of its flash suppressor, the K1 exhibited serious problems in service with the ROK armed forces. The original version had excessive recoil, noise, flash, and weak stock due to increase in firepower. These problems caused difficulty in aiming especially during night operation.

These shortcomings were later fixed by the development and adoption of a new flash suppressor, which has three holes in the top right quadrant to limit muzzle flip under rapid fire and reduces flash to one-third of that of the early K1. This new version of K1 is known as the K1A and its production began in 1982. All K1's in service were subsequently modified to the K1A standard. The K1A is often mated with the PVS-4K rail integration system created by Dong In Optical (DI Optical). It is seen as a potential candidate for the "Warrior Platform", a Korean next-generation infantry project.

Since 2014, newly produced and repaired K1A received new barrel suited for firing 5.56×45mm NATO ammunition. Various RIS systems developed by D.I (Dong In) Optical and MITS have been issued in small quantities, primarily to SWC units.

== Differences from K2 ==
Although the K1 and K2 share development history they are very different from each other for the following reasons:

- The development of K1 was completed earlier than that of K2.
- The K1 uses the direct impingement gas system, while the K2 uses AK-47 style gas piston system.
- The K1 has 1-in-12 rifling twist for the M193 ammunition, while the K2 has 1-in-7.3 rifling twist for the M855 ammunition.

The carbine version of K2 named K2C was developed and shown to the public in 2012 by SNT Motiv.

== Variants ==
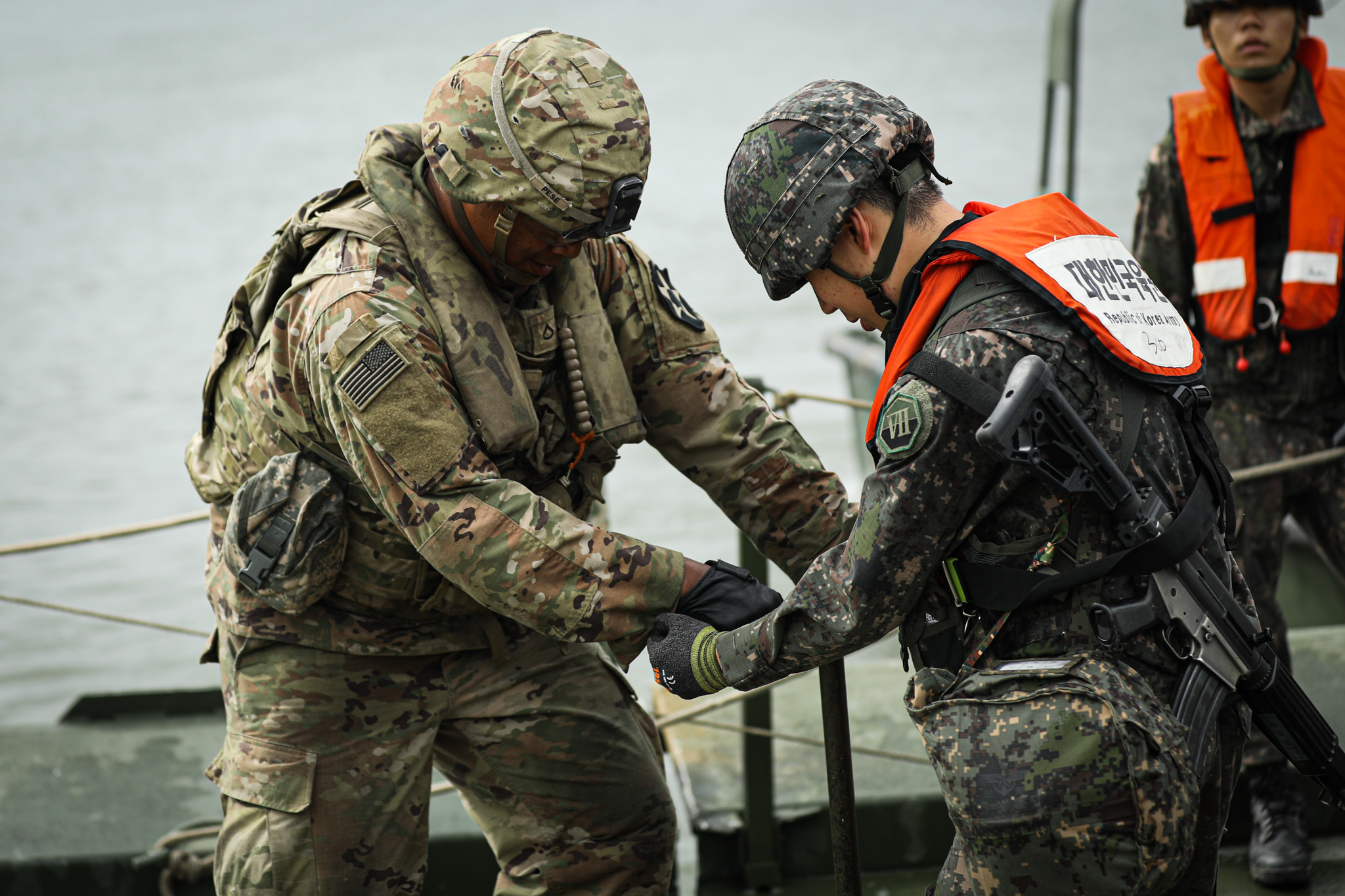
A ROK Army soldier armed with K1AC1

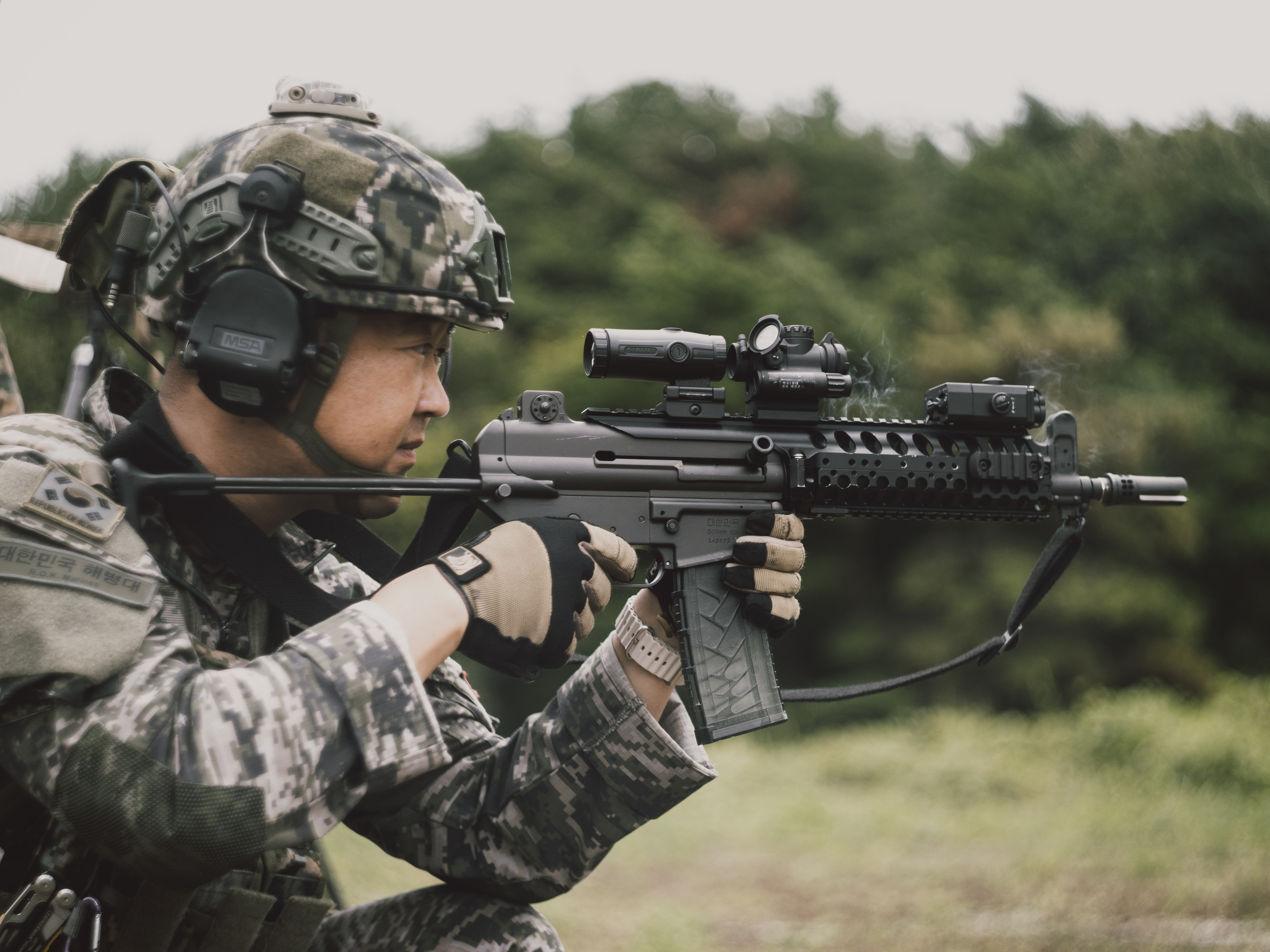
ROK Marine soldier with K1A with the modernization kit

- XK1: Experimental prototype.
- K1: First mass-produced variant. Every K1 has been modified to K1A standard.
- K1A: Second mass-produced enhanced variant.
  - K1A1/MAX-1/AR-110C: Semi-automatic version of K1A for export civilian market with an extended 16" barrel and stock in compliance of barrel and overall length of the National Firearms Act. All variants were marked 5.56×45mm NATO.
  - K1AC1: Variant with a K2C1 5 position stock on a stock adapter. Issue started in 2025, planned to replace all K1A.

== Future replacement ==
The S&T Motiv K2C, a carbine variant of the K2 rifle, was provided to the Republic of Korea Army Special Warfare Command (ROKA-SWC) for evaluation. However, after a series of tests, the K2C was rejected. Subsequently, the ROK Armed Forces initiated a competition to select a new carbine to replace the K1A.

The procurement process was divided into two programs: the Special Operations Submachine Gun Type I and Type II. The Type I program aimed to develop a new weapon system for mass deployment across the ROK Armed Forces, while the Type II program was a limited procurement intended to fulfill urgent operational needs of selected units, primarily from the ROK-SWC.

On 13 June 2020, the ROK-SWC announced the selection of the Dasan Machineries' DSAR-15PC as the base model for the Type I program. Based on the CAR 816 and other AR-15 platforms, the DSAR-15PC features an 11.5 in (290 mm) barrel and weighs approximately 3 kg (6.6 lb). An initial batch of 1,000 rifles was planned for delivery to gather user feedback, with a total of 15,000 units to be delivered by 2023. However, on 14 July 2021, the acquisition was cancelled following a leak of military secrets by a company executive.

In October 2023, SNT Motiv (formerly Daewoo Precision Industries) announced that its STC-16 carbine had been selected under the Type II program. The carbine, designated as the K13, is a 5.56×45mm short-stroke gas-piston system with a free-floating 292 mm barrel, and weighs approximately 3 kg. A total of 1,710 K13 carbines were planned for delivery as a partial replacement for the K1A. Deployment of the K13 began in February 2024. However, reports soon emerged of cartridge explosions during live fire exercises, though no injuries were reported.

The Type I program was eventually reinitiated in 2025, with the goal of delivering an additional 16,000 carbines to fully replace the K1A by 2027, at a projected cost of ₩65.483 billion (approximately US$46 million). Expected competitors include SNT Motiv's upgraded variants of the STC-16: the STC-16A1, featuring direct impingement operation, a slimmer upper receiver and handguard, and a forward assist; and the STC-16A2, which retains the short-stroke gas piston operation but incorporates a forward assist. Dasan Machineries is also participating with its DSAR-15PQ, equipped with a quick-change barrel.

== Users ==
- Cambodia: Used by Special Forces Command (Cambodia) 137 K1As sold.

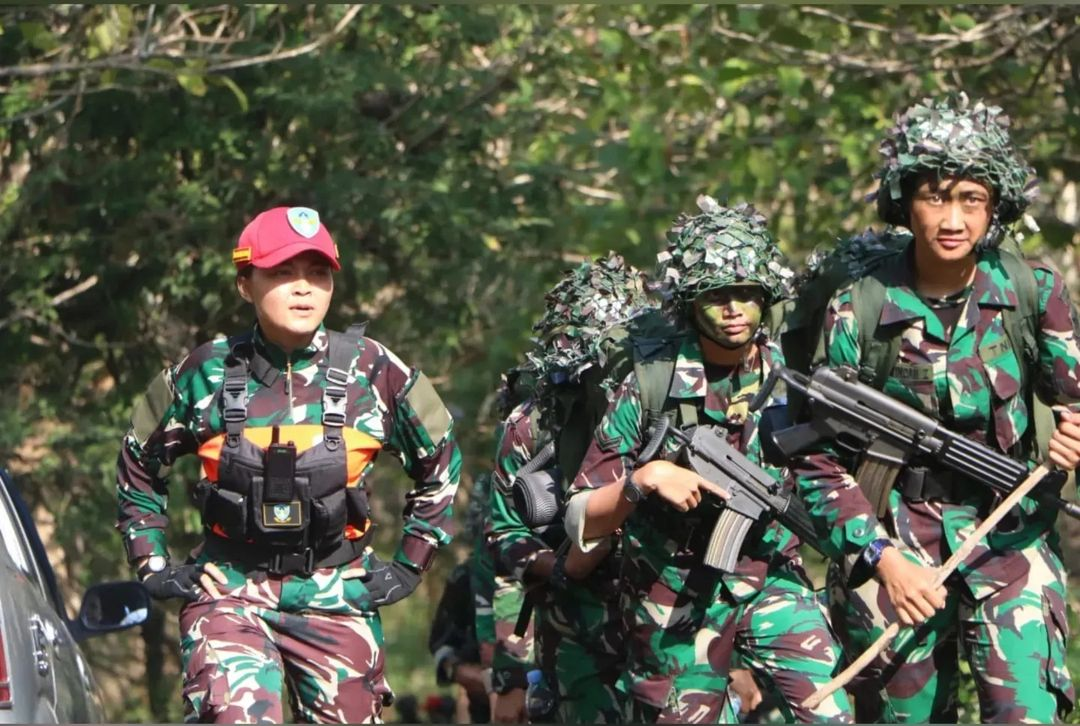
Indonesian Air Force Military Police NCOs with K1 carbines

- Indonesia: Used by the Indonesian Air Force.
- South Korea: Standard-issued submachine gun of the ROK Armed Forces. Will be partially replaced by the STC16/K13/K17 carbine.
- Papua New Guinea
- Senegal: Received 280 K1A rifles in 2003.
- Singapore: 855 K1As sold to Singapore from a SIPRI small arms report in 2019.

== See also ==
- M3 submachine gun: used prior to and replaced by K1A
- Daewoo Precision Industries K2: related development
- Daewoo Precision Industries K7: 9×19 Parabellum submachine gun with permanent silencer based on K1A
- S&T Motiv K2C: proposed replacement, rejected after field test
- Dasan Machineries DSAR-15: initially selected winner for replacement of K1A by ROKASWC, later rejected
