= List of workplace spree killings =

This is a list of mass murders and spree killings committed at the perpetrator's current or former workplace. A mass murder is typically defined as a single incident in which three or more people are killed, with no "cooling off" period, not including perpetrators. A mass murder typically occurs in a single location where one or more persons kill several others.

This list does not include serial killers or major figures in politics and government who orchestrated such actions.

== In civilian settings ==
Date	Year	Location	Country	Dead	Injured	Total	W	Article/Reference	Fate of perpetrators	Additional notes
13 Dec	1993	Fuzhou	China	61	15	76	A		Sentenced to death and executed	
20 Aug	1986	Edmond, Oklahoma	United States	14	6	20	F	Edmond post office shooting	Committed suicide	
2 Apr	1982	Guilin	China	13	3	16	F		Committed suicide	
27–29 July	1999	Stockbridge & Atlanta, Georgia	United States	12	13	25	FM	1999 Atlanta day trading firm shootings	Committed suicide	(Note: At least one of the victims was a relative of the assailant.)
31 May	2019	Virginia Beach, Virginia	United States	12	4	16	F	2019 Virginia Beach shooting	Killed by police	(Note: At least one of the victims was not a co-worker of the perpetrator (not indicated, if the victim was a relative).)
16 Feb	1999	Fishing vessel Jinqing 12	Taiwan	12	0	12	F		Sentenced to 20 years in prison	3 more died by jumping overboard
22 August	1928	Rockville, California	United States	11	4	15	FM	1928 Fairfield murders	Sentenced to death, committed suicide in prison	
29 July	1982	Maputo	Mozambique	9	0	9	F		Sentenced to death and executed (in China)	
26 May	2021	San Jose, California	United States	9	0	9	FA	2021 San Jose shooting	Committed suicide	
16 Jan	2005	Kalibo	Philippines	8	29–33	37–41	F		Killed by police	(Note: Assailant was a member of the police at the time of the killings.)
14 Sep	1989	Louisville, Kentucky	United States	8	12	20	F	Standard Gravure shooting	Committed suicide	
31 July	2002	Beirut	Lebanon	8	5	13	F		Sentenced to death and executed	
25 Aug	1992	Goedemoed	South Africa	8	4	12	F	Goedemoed shooting	Committed suicide	
15 Apr	2021	Indianapolis, Indiana	United States	8	4	12	F	2021 Indianapolis FedEx shooting	Committed suicide	
3 Aug	2010	Manchester, Connecticut	United States	8	2	10	F	Hartford Distributors shooting	Committed suicide	
29 Nov	1993	Daxin County	China	8	?	8+	F		Killed by police	
11 Feb	1958	Lyamino	Soviet Union	7	6	13	F		Sentenced to death and executed	
16 Feb	1988	Sunnyvale, California	United States	7	4	11	F E	Sunnyvale ESL shooting	Sentenced to death	
1 July	1992	Besançon	France	7	4	11	F		Committed suicide	
26 Jan	1962	New Taipei City	Taiwan	7	3	10	F		Sentenced to death and executed	
21/22 June	1828	Brig Mary Russell		7	2	9	FM	Mary Russell murders	Found not guilty by reason of insanity	
12 July	1976	Fullerton, California	United States U.S.	7	2	9	F	1976 California State University, Fullerton massacre	Found not guilty by reason of insanity	
27 Nov	2004	Baramulla	India	7	2	9	F		Killed by police	
Oct 1	1913	Bas-Briacé	France	7	0	7	M		Sentenced to 20 years in prison	
2 Nov	1999	Honolulu, Hawaii	United States	7	0	7	F	1999 Honolulu shooting	Sentenced to life imprisonment	
26 Dec	2000	Wakefield, Massachusetts	United States	7	0	7	F	Edgewater Technology shooting	Sentenced to life imprisonment	
30 Jan	2006	Goleta, California	United States	7	0	7	F	2006 Goleta postal facility shooting	Committed suicide	
14 July	2016	Kapenguria	Kenya	7	0	7	F		Killed by police	
8 July	2003	Meridian, Mississippi	United States	6	8	14	F	2003 Lockheed Martin shooting	Committed suicide	
23 Oct	1967	Lock Haven, Pennsylvania	United States	6	6	12	F	1967 Clinton County, Pennsylvania shootings	Killed by police	
21 June	1972	Cherry Hill, New Jersey	United States	6	6	12	F	1972 Cherry Hill shooting	Committed suicide	
14 Feb	1977	New Rochelle, New York	United States	6	4	10	F	1977 New Rochelle shooting	Committed suicide	
9 Aug	1982	Grand Prairie, Texas	United States	6	4	10	F V	1982 Grand Prairie warehouse shootings	Killed by police	
22 June	2013	Shanghai	China	6	4	10	FM	2013 Shanghai shooting	Sentenced to death and executed	
22 Nov	2022	Chesapeake, Virginia	United States	6	4	10	F	2022 Chesapeake shooting	Committed suicide	
27 Sep	2012	Minneapolis, Minnesota	United States	6	2	8	F	Minneapolis firm shooting	Committed suicide	
17/18 Oct	1887	Schooner Johannes		6	1	7	M		Sentenced to 10 years penal service	
16 Dec	1935	Los Angeles, California	United States	6	1	7	F		Found not guilty by reason of insanity	
7 Sep	1964	Malyy Melik	Soviet Union	6	1	7	F		Sentenced to death and executed	
16/17 July	2010	Kuchai	India	6	1	7	F		Killed by police	
26 Dec	2011	Khuan Ma Phrao	Thailand	6	1	7	F		Committed suicide	
7 Nov	2012	Moscow	Russia	6	1	7	F	2012 Moscow shooting	Sentenced to life imprisonment	
19 March	2014	Kars	Turkey	6	1	7	F		Committed suicide	
31 March	1926	Malahide	Ireland	6	0	6	MP		Sentenced to death and executed	
27 Aug	2003	Chicago, Illinois	United States	6	0	6	F	2003 Chicago warehouse shooting	Killed by police	
29 Nov	2010	Pachir Wagam	Afghanistan	6	0	6	F		Killed by soldiers	
		Fergusson Island	Papua New Guinea Papua New Guinea	6	?	6+	M		Killed	
10 Apr	2023	Louisville, Kentucky	United States	5	8	13	F	2023 Louisville bank shooting	Killed by police	
15 Feb	2019	Aurora, Illinois	United States	5	6	11	F	2019 Aurora, Illinois shooting	Killed by police	
11 June	1997	Lang Suan	Thailand	5	5	10	F		Committed suicide	
9 Nov	2015	Amman	Jordan	5	5	10	F	2015 Amman shooting attack	Killed by police	
24 June	2008	Henderson, Kentucky	United States	5	1	6	F	2008 Atlantis Plastics shooting	Committed suicide	
6 May	1940	South Pasadena, California	United States	5	1	6	F	1940 South Pasadena shootings	Attempted suicide but instead arrested by police	
3 Apr	1995	Corpus Christi, Texas	United States	5	0	5	F	1995 Corpus Christi shooting	Committed suicide	
5 June	2017	Orlando, Florida	United States	5	0	5	F	2017 Orlando factory shooting	Committed suicide	
5 Apr	2018	Eskişehir	Turkey	4	3	7	F	Eskişehir University shooting	Sentenced to life imprisonment	
12 Jan	2010	Kennesaw, Georgia	United States	4	1	5	F	Penske office shooting	Committed to a psychiatric facility in 2017	One of the injured victims died in 2013
24 Aug	1992	Montreal, Quebec	Canada	4	1	5	F	Concordia University massacre	Sentenced to life imprisonment	
7 Mar	1998	Newington, Connecticut	United States	4	0	4	F	1998 Connecticut Lottery shooting	Committed suicide	
Sep	1845	Barque Tory		3	14	17	M		Found not guilty by reason of insanity	
25 Feb	2016	Hesston, Kansas	United States	3	14	17	F	Hesston shootings	Killed by police	
17 April	2004	Mitrovica	Serbia and Montenegro	3	11	14	F		Killed by police	
28 May	1982	Bethesda, Maryland	United States	3	9	12	F V		Sentenced to three consecutive life terms and 1,080 years in prison Committed suicide in prison in 1986	
20 Sep	2018	Aberdeen, Maryland	United States	3	3	6	F	2018 Aberdeen, Maryland, shooting	Committed suicide	
12 Feb	2010	Huntsville, Alabama	United States	3	3	6	F	2010 University of Alabama in Huntsville shooting	Sentenced to life in prison without the possibility of parole.	
23 Aug	2017	Nizhny Novgorod	Russia	3	2	5	ME		Wounded by police, detained and sent for compulsory psychiatric treatment in 2018	
18 Dec	1996	São Paulo, São Paulo	Brazil	3	2	5	F		Committed suicide	
15 Jun	2012	Edmonton, Alberta	Canada	3	1	4	F	2012 HUB Mall shooting	Sentenced to life in prison without the possibility of parole for 40 years.	
25 March	1978	Henrico County, Virginia	United States	3	0	3	F	Charles Stamper	Sentenced to death and executed in Virginia	
17 Dec	1999	Valparaíso	Chile	3	0	3	F	Valparaíso school shootings	Found not guilty by reason of insanity	
8 June	2017	Eaton Township, Pennsylvania	United States	3	0	3	F	2017 Eaton Township Weis Markets shooting	Committed suicide	
27 Jan	2015	Blagoveshchensk, Amur Oblast	Russia	3	0	3	F		Committed suicide	
21 Aug	2024	Sanski Most, Una-Sana Canton	Bosnia and Herzegovina	3	0	3	F	Sanski Most school shooting	Sentenced to 42 years' imprisonment	

== In the military ==
Date	Year	Location	Country	Dead	Injured	Total	W	Article/Reference	Fate of perpetrators	Additional notes
15 April	1996	Timika Airport	Indonesia	16	11	27	F	1996 Timika shooting	Sentenced to death	(Note: At least one of the victims was not a co-worker of the perpetrator (not indicated, if the victim was a relative).)
5 Nov	2009	Fort Hood, Texas	United States	13	32	45	F	2009 Fort Hood shooting	Sentenced to death	Terminated a pregnancy
16 Sep	2013	Washington, D.C.	United States	12	3	15	F	Washington Navy Yard shooting	Killed by police	
15 Oct	2022	Soloti	Russia	11	15	26	F	Soloti military training ground shooting	Both perpetrators killed by soldiers	
26 Apr	2016	Praia	Cape Verde	11	0	11	F	Monte Tchota massacre	Sentenced to 35 years in prison	
1 May	1974	Kimpo	South Korea	10	3	13	F		Committed suicide	
1 June	1997	Sida	Abkhazia	10	3	13	F	Sida shooting	Committed suicide	
27 Apr	2011	Kabul	Afghanistan	9	1–6	10–16	F		Committed suicide	
23 Apr	1946	LST-172	China	9	1	10	F		Committed suicide while awaiting trial	(Note: Assailant was a member of the U.S. military in a foreign country.)
2 March	1988	Athurugiriya	Sri Lanka	8	9	17	F		Killed by soldiers	
25 May	2015	Tunis	Tunisia	8	9	17	FM	2015 Tunis barracks shooting	Shot dead	
16 Sep	1999	Bloemfontein	South Africa	8	4	12	F	1999 Tempe military base shooting	Killed by soldiers	
19 June	2005	Yeoncheon	South Korea	8	4	12	F E		Sentenced to death	
23 Feb	1987	Leningrad Oblast	Soviet Union	8	0	8	F		Found not guilty by reason of insanity	
19 Dec	1967	Harmanli Municipality	People's Republic of Bulgaria	7	7	14	F		Sentenced to death and executed	
13 Dec	2009	Ta'izz	Yemen	7	6	13	F		Sentenced to death	
28 Aug	2012	Belidzhi	Russia	7	6	13	F		Killed by soldiers	
3 June	1993	Vranje	FR Yugoslavia	7	4	11	FM	Vranje shooting	Committed suicide	
24 Nov	1938	Kanwali	British Raj	7	2	9	F		Killed by soldiers	
24 June	1997	Gamardjveba	Georgia Flag	7	0	7	F		Both perpetrators sentenced to life imprisonment	
23 April	2012	Hyesan	North Korea	7	0	7	F		Arrested	
7 Jan	2017	Hyesan	North Korea	7	0	7	F		Arrested	
29 March	1961	Guellat Bou Sbaa	Algeria	6	14	20	F		Died	
11 Aug	1955	Kuala Lumpur	Malaysia	6	12–14	18–20	F		Committed suicide	
22 Oct	1876	Makassar	Indonesia	6	9	15	M		Killed by soldiers	
5 Sep	1978		Philippines	6	7	13			Committed suicide	
13 July	1978	Marantwo	Philippines	6	6	12			Committed suicide	
21 March	1985	Torpedo boat No. 3213		6	2	8	F		Both sentenced to death	
11 Feb	1998	Armavir	Armenia	6	2	8	F		Committed suicide	
13 April	1914	Tank	British Raj	6	1	7	F		Killed by soldiers	
23 Jan	1958	Hongcheon	South Korea	6	0	6	F		Committed suicide	
24 Oct	2010	Palid	Philippines	6	0	6	F		Killed by soldiers	
Dec	1967	Cosalá	Mexico	6	?	6+	F		Killed	
11 July	1976	Pagadian City	Philippines	6	?	6+	F		Killed	
20 Oct	1985	Pamplona	Philippines	6	?	6+	F		Committed suicide	
20 Jan	2012	FOB Gwan	Afghanistan	5	14	19	F		Sentenced to death	
22 Oct	2015	Upper Cabengbeng	Philippines	5	9	14	F		Shot by soldiers	
17 April	1916	Vienna	Austria-Hungary	5	7	12	F		Found not guilty by reason of insanity	
21 June	2014	Goseong County	South Korea	5	7	12	F E	Goseong military base shooting	Sentenced to death	
8 Aug	2015	Bangui	Central African Republic	5	7	12	F		Killed by soldiers	
27 Jan	2005	Gerishk District	Afghanistan	5	6	11	F		Killed by soldiers	
5 June	1969	Wonju	South Korea	5	5–6	10–11	F		Committed suicide	
13 April	1884	Pizzofalcone	Italy	4–7	5–13	9–20	F		Sentenced to death and executed	
23 Nov	1988	Ajuda	Portugal	4	14	18	F		Committed suicide or killed by soldiers	
Oct 29	2011	FOB Pacemaker	Afghanistan	4	10–11	14–15	F		Killed by soldiers	
17 Sep	1993	La Unión	El Salvador	4	6	10	F		Killed by soldiers	
8/9 Oct	1876	Aceh	Indonesia	3–5	16–17	9–22			Killed by soldiers	
2 April	2014	Fort Hood	United States	3	12	15	F	2014 Fort Hood shootings	Committed suicide	
24 Aug	1955	Manston	United Kingdom	3	9	12	F		Committed suicide	
31 May	2020	Montevideo	Uruguay	3	0	3	F		Sentenced to 29 years in prison	

== Abbreviations and footnotes ==
W – A basic description of the weapons used in the murders

F – Firearms and other ranged weapons, especially rifles and handguns, but also bows and crossbows, grenade launchers, flamethrowers, or slingshots
M – Melee weapons, like knives, swords, spears, machetes, axes, clubs, rods, stones, or bare hands
O – Any other weapons, such as bombs, hand grenades, Molotov cocktails, poison and poisonous gas, as well as vehicle and arson attacks

A – indicates that an arson attack was the only other weapon used
V – indicates that a vehicle was the only other weapon used
E – indicates that explosives of any sort were the only other weapon used
P – indicates that an anaesthetising or deadly substance of any kind was the only other weapon used (includes poisonous gas)
