= 2003 Lockheed Martin shooting =

Mass shooting in Mississippi, U.S.

Lockheed Martin shooting
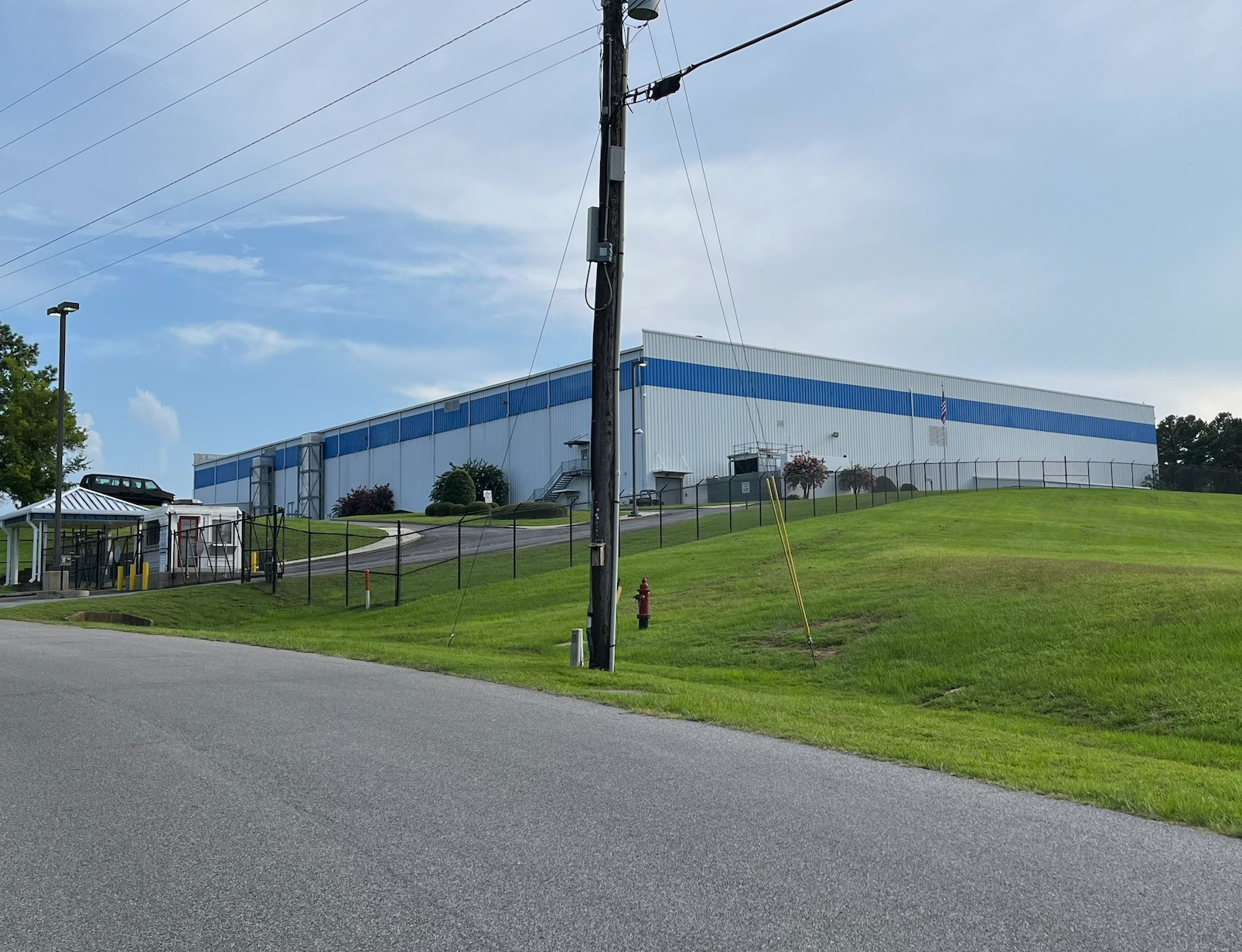
- The Lockheed Martin plant in 2023
- Location: 32°24′38.2″N 88°38′2.3″W; Lauderdale County, Mississippi, U.S.
- Date: July 8, 2003; 23 years ago 09:30 a.m. – 09:40 a.m. (CDT UTC-05:00)
- Target: Coworkers, particularly African Americans
- Attack type: Mass shooting, murder-suicide, mass murder, workplace shooting, hate crime
- Weapons: 12-gauge Winchester shotgun; Ruger Mini-14 .223-caliber rifle (Unused)
- Deaths: 7 (including the perpetrator)
- Injuries: 8
- Perpetrator: Douglas Paul Williams
- Motive: Anti-black racism

The Lockheed Martin shooting occurred on July 8, 2003, at a plant in unincorporated Lauderdale County, Mississippi, United States, near Meridian. The gunman, Douglas Paul Williams, an assembly line worker at the plant, shot 14 of his co-workers with a shotgun, killing six of them, (Note: Five of the victims died on the day of the shooting and the 6th victim initially survived the shooting but died one week later.) before committing suicide. After the shooting, information surfaced depicting Williams' history of making threats and racist comments directed at African-American coworkers. Five of the six killed in the incident were black.

The incident was the deadliest workplace shooting in the United States since December 2000, when Michael McDermott killed six co-workers at Edgewater Technology in Wakefield, Massachusetts. Given the nature of the attack and Williams' long-known history of racially motivated threatening behavior, the incident was described by some at the time as the worst hate crime against African-Americans since the civil rights movement.

== Shooting ==
On the day of the shooting, Williams attended a mandatory ethics and diversity class together with 13 others. According to some colleagues, Williams arrived at the plant in a very agitated state and made threats to kill other workers. Others, who said they talked to him prior to the shooting, stated that he "gave no indications that anything was wrong." Williams only stayed at the meeting for a few minutes. After having a normal conversation with his colleague Al Collier, who described it as a "friendly little talk", Williams suddenly stormed out of the room, saying "y'all can handle this." Telling his supervisor, Jeff McWilliams, that he would take the matters into his own hands, Williams went to retrieve several guns from his pickup truck. He returned to the annex wearing a bandana, and armed with a 12 gauge shotgun, a .223 semiautomatic rifle, and a bandolier with ammunition draped across his chest.

At approximately 9:30 a.m., Williams entered the room, yelling "I told y'all to stop fucking with me! Didn't I tell y'all not to fuck with me?", and began shooting. He first killed Mickey Fitzgerald, who tried to calm him down, with a shot in the face, before turning his attention towards a group of four workers on the floor. Williams killed Sam Cockrell, who he believed had made complaints about him to the management; he wounded Al Collier, who was shot in the back and right hand. He also wounded Charles Scott, and fatally wounded DeLois Bailey when she tried to flee. Steve Cobb, the plant manager, as well as Brad Bynum, Chuck McReynolds, and Brenda Dubose, whose head and hand were grazed by bullet fragments, were also wounded by ricochet. Williams then went out of the room, but returned after a short while and, searching and calling for Jack Johns, the production manager, continued shooting.

Williams eventually left the annex and headed for the main factory, searching for other employees who had reported him to the management for making racist threats. There, he was apprehended by his colleague Pete Threatt, who tried to take away his gun, but Williams pushed him out of the way, lowered the shotgun with the words "Get out of my way or I'll kill you, too," and moved on. While Threatt tried to make the others aware of the gunman, screaming for people to take cover, Williams walked through the plant and shot five other people, most of them at point-blank range. He killed Charles J. Miller, Thomas Willis, and Lynette McCall at their work stations and wounded Henry Odom and Randy Wright, before his girlfriend and co-worker, Shirley J. Price, began pleading with him to stop shooting. Williams then committed suicide in front of her by shooting himself in the torso. His rampage had lasted approximately ten minutes.

Three more weapons were later found in his car by police: a .22 Magnum Derringer, a .45-caliber Ruger P90 pistol, and a .22-caliber rifle with a scope.

== Victims ==
=== Fatalities ===
Six people were killed in the shooting. They are:

- DeLois Darden Bailey, 53, died of her wounds on July 15
- Samuel Edward Cockrell Jr., 46, of Meridian, Mississippi
- Mickey Lee Fitzgerald, 45, of Little Rock, Mississippi
- Lynette S. McCall, 47, of Cuba, Alabama
- Rev. Charles J. Miller, 58, of Meridian, Mississippi
- Thomas Willis, 57, of Lisman, Alabama

=== Injuries ===
- Brad Bynum, 29
- Steve Cobb, 46
- Al Collier, 49
- Brenda Dubose, 55
- Chuck McReynolds, 62
- Henry Odom, 57
- Charles Scott, 65
- Randy Wright, 55

== Motive ==
Undated picture of Williams

After the shooting, plant employees reported to the media that Williams had a history of conflicts with his co-workers and management, with one describing Williams as being "mad at the world." Local law enforcement initially stated that the incident had no clear motive, with Lauderdale County Sheriff Billy Sollie saying, "There was no indication it involved race or gender as far as his targets were concerned." 70% of plant employees were white, and five of the six fatalities in the shooting were African American. In the immediate aftermath of the shooting, the President of Lockheed Martin refused to disclose whether company officials were previously aware of any red flags regarding Williams.

Further investigations were conducted in the days and months after the shooting. It surfaced that black coworkers of Williams had reported receiving numerous threats and disturbing incidents to management, causing Lockheed Martin to open its own investigation prior to the shooting. In 2001, Thomas Willis reported being intimidated by Williams; an investigator was called in, to whom Willis reported at least three examples of racially motivated death threats. Another black employee, Aaron Hopson, also reported a threat. "He said, 'You know, one of these days, I'm goin' to come in here and kill me a bunch of niggers and then I'm goin' to kill myself.'" Williams was ordered to attend diversity and anger management courses; he refused.

A month before the shooting, while he was on the factory floor, Williams put a white work bootie on his head in imitation of a Ku Klux Klan hood. Hours later, an assistant plant manager asked him to remove it. Williams refused and demanded to know who had reported him. Told to either remove the hood or leave, Williams left, taking an additional week off work without permission. When he returned, he was again ordered to attend diversity training but not otherwise disciplined.

Bobby McCall, the husband of one of the victims, told an ABC News reporter, "He had a list, and he called his list the 'good niggers and the bad niggers.'" Williams' computer login was later revealed to be "white power." Two years after the shooting, the lawyer representing Thomas Willis' family observed, "I can't imagine a hate crime that had more forewarning than this one."

== See also ==
- Charleston church shooting (2015)
- 2018 Jeffersontown shooting
- Buffalo supermarket shooting (2022)
