= Goseong military base shooting =

Mass shooting in Gangwon, South Korea

- Location of Goseong County in South Korea
- Location: Goseong County, Gangwon, South Korea
- Date: 21 June 2014 – 22 June 2014; 20:15 – 09:13 (KST; UTC+09:00)
- Target: Republic of Korea Army soldiers
- Attack type: Mass shooting, shootout
- Weapon: Daewoo K2 assault rifle
- Deaths: 5
- Injuries: 7
- Perpetrator: Lim Do-bin
- Motive: Revenge for hazing
- Charges: Murder
- Verdict: Guilty, sentenced to death in 2015

On 21 June 2014, a mass shooting took place at the 13th outpost of the 55th Regiment of the Republic of Korea Army's 22nd Infantry Division in Goseong County, Gangwon, South Korea.

The incident began when Lim Do-bin of the 22nd Infantry Division killed five fellow soldiers and injured seven others before deserting from his unit armed with a K-2 rifle and 60 rounds of ammunition. Shortly after his desertion became known, the Ministry of National Defense set up an accident task force to take up follow-up measures, while issuing a level-one Jindo Dog Alert, the highest form of localized emergency, in the area.

During the one-day manhunt, a gun fight took place near an elementary school, but Lim escaped again at 11 p.m. On 23 June, the Ministry of National Defense reported they had captured Lim Do-bin following a stand-off after he had shot himself trying to commit suicide.

Lim suffered hazing in the unit and this was identified as one of the main motives behind his desertion and subsequent shooting. In 2015, he was court-martialed for the murders and sentenced to death.

== Background ==
The 22nd Infantry Division was the site of a previous incident in June 1984, in which private first class Cho Joon-hee threw a grenade and fired upon a dormitory, killing 15 soldiers and injuring 11 others. Private Cho later defected to North Korea. In December 2005, two reservists, including a 26-year-old sergeant identified only by his surname Jeong, stole two K-2 rifles, six grenades and 700 rounds of ammunition from a subordinate unit of the 22nd Infantry Division. In 2012, a North Korean soldier crossed the fence without being spotted and knocked on the dormitory door of the South Korean military GP, requesting to defect. The 22nd Division commander was reprimanded by President Lee Myung-bak for his poor maintenance of military discipline and the border with North Korea.

== Shooting ==
The shooting took place in the evening hours of 21 June 2014 on an outpost of the Republic of Korea Army on the eastern front of Goseong-gun, Gangwon-do. A statement by the Army the day after the incident reported, "Senior Sergeant Lim Do-bin (22) fired about 10 bullets from his K-2 rifle, killing five people, including soldiers and noncommissioned officers, and injuring seven others." Lim had been assigned to the outpost weekly guard duty from 2 p.m. to 7:55 p.m. and was issued a K-2 rifle, a grenade, and 75 rounds of live ammunition when he was put on duty.

Lim was supposed to return his weapons at the end of the shift but did not do so. Approximately 20 minutes later, at around 20:15 p.m., he threw a grenade and fired at a fellow soldier at a three-way street on the outpost's rear supply route. He continued shooting at the fleeing soldiers then entered the dormitory and fired on several more soldiers. In total, he killed five soldiers and wounded seven others. Three had died outside the dormitory and two inside the dormitory. Two of the wounded reportedly had sustained serious injuries. After the shooting, Lim deserted with his K-2 rifle and several dozen rounds of ammunition.

Early reporting mistakenly described the incident as an accidental firearms discharge and that it had occurred at Yanggu-gun. Minutes after the initial reports, a ministry official stated that, considering that about a dozen casualties were reported with 10 shots, it appeared that the shooting was intentional. At 10:52 p.m., Yonhap News Agency corrected the location, but continued to report it as an accident.

== Manhunt ==
After the initial incident, the Ministry of National Defense set up a task force with the head of the personnel and welfare office, Park Dae-sup (former chief of the 57th Infantry Division), in charge, and took follow-up measures, including issuing a "One Jindo Dog" (military and police emergency alert) for Goseong, Gangwon Province. Checkpoints were set up on major escape routes and a front-line fence was inspected, in case Lim was planning to defect to North Korea. The military mobilized 3,500 troops from nine battalions to conduct the search. The search was later criticized as Lim had come into contact with search parties more than three times but had lied about his identity and was not recognized or apprehended. Further criticism arose over the belated move to issue the One Jindo dog order until two hours after the initial shooting.

On 22 June, Lim was tracked to Hyeonnae-myeon (approximately 10 km from the initial shooting) and a firefight occurred, during which a platoon leader was injured by a shot to the arm. About 500 residents near Myeongpa Elementary School were evacuated to nearby schools and gymnasiums. Meanwhile, the military continued to issue broadcasts via helicopter and vehicle encouraging Lim to surrender. Lim's parents were escorted to the area and implored him to turn himself in. The Ministry of National Defense also deployed all personnel in the outpost area of the 22nd Division of the Army to prevent Lim from defecting to North Korea, raised the alert to the highest level, and stated that if Lim did not surrender, he would be killed. Despite his parents' pleas, however, Lim refused to surrender and fled when cordon troops attempted to take him into custody around 11 p.m.

On 23 June, the military deployed members of the 703rd Special Assault Force and snipers to apprehend Lim. A friendly fire incident occurred at 8:40 a.m. when two search parties mistakenly fired on one another resulting in one corporal receiving an injury to his right temple. At 8:20 am, searchers approached to within 7 to 8 meters of Lim and threw him bread and water, as well as a mobile phone to speak with his parents. At 11:25 am, the commander of the 703rd, a 703rd captain, the 8th army military police commander, as well as Lim's parents and brother tried to persuade him to surrender, however, Lim replied, "I've done an awful job anyway. If I go back, I'll be executed." Their conversation lasted until 2:55 p.m. At 2:25 p.m., half an hour before the suicide attempt, Lim demanded pen and paper. Lim was captured at 2:44 p.m. after he tried to commit suicide by shooting himself in the abdomen with his rifle. Next to Sergeant Lim was a suicide note that he appeared to have written with the pen and paper provided. According to the Ministry of National Defense's announcement on June 24, the suicide note contained apologies to the families of the victims, including their parents. Lim was taken to a hospital on the 23rd and underwent emergency surgery including partial resection of his left lung before being taken to an intensive care unit to recover.

The reason for the shooting spree was initially unknown. Munhwa Ilbo reported that Lim had written a suicide note just before he shot himself, saying, "I had a hard time living in the unit because I was ostracized by my predecessors and successors." Lim was reportedly ridiculed by others in his unit who drew caricatures of him as SpongeBob.

KBS also pointed out that although it has been nine years since the campaign in 2005 to improve the barracks culture, there were still bad practices such as abuse and personal attacks.

== Casualties ==
The five individuals killed during the shooting were identified as Staff Sergeant Kim, Corporal Jin, Corporal Lee, Private Choi, and Private Kim.

== Reaction of the State ==
The Blue House held a meeting of senior secretaries presided over by its chief of staff Kim Ki-choon at 2 p.m. on June 22 to discuss countermeasures against the shooting. "Unfortunately, I am sorry that this happened on the day the president returned from his trip," Kim Ki-choon said at the meeting. "We sincerely apologize for causing concern to the people," said Kim Min-seok, a spokesman for the Ministry of National Defense. "We will offer our deepest condolences to the families of the dead and injured, and will do our best to provide all necessary support and efforts." Prime Minister Chung Hong-won said, "The military. We must promptly arrest armed deserters under the auspices of police to prevent further damage," he told the defense minister and the police chief. Saenuri Party spokesman Ham Jin-kyu said in a commentary on June 22 that "it is really sad that such a terrible incident has happened," and consoled the victims, their families and wounded soldiers. He then demanded that the military make all-out efforts to promptly arrest those responsible to prevent further casualties. Kum Tae-sup, a spokesman for the main opposition New Politics Alliance for Democracy, called for a thorough investigation of the accident and strong measures to prevent such an incident from happening again on the front line. The first plenary session of the National Defense Commission in the second half of the 19th National Assembly on June 24 began with a silent tribute to the victims of the shooting rampage.

== Investigation and trial ==
In July 2014, the investigation of the Korean military on the incident was completed; the investigation said the attack was in revenge for bullying Lim had received in the army and at school.

In October 2014, the Army took disciplinary action against two division chiefs, holding them responsible for the June 2014 shooting committed by Lim and the April 2014 hazing death of 28th Division's Private Yoon Seung-joo. The military prosecution refuted the claim, saying, "Although the number of troops has reached 40, only three to four have taken the lead in bullying."

On 3 February 2015, the General Military Court of the First Army Command sentenced Sergeant Lim Do-bin to the death penalty. "The accused committed persistent and planned crimes, including the murder of an unarmed comrade in his dormitory," the court said. "A dramatic sentence is inevitable for the brutal crime of shooting a gun at an innocent comrade."

== See also ==
- Ganghwa Island shooting
- Woo Bum-kon incident
- Hazing in the Republic of Korea Armed Forces
