= 2017 Eaton Township Weis Markets shooting =

Shooting attack in Pennsylvania, U.S.

Eaton Township Weis Markets shooting
- Location: 41.5291°N 75.9474°W; Eaton Township, Pennsylvania, U.S.
- Date: June 8, 2017; 12:40 a.m. (EDT; UTC−04:00)
- Target: Employees at Weis Markets
- Attack type: Mass murder; murder-suicide; workplace shooting
- Weapon: Two pistol gripped 12-gauge Mossberg 500 pump-action shotguns (only one used)
- Deaths: 4 (including the perpetrator)
- Injuries: 0
- Perpetrator: Randy Stair
- Motive: Misanthropy; Suicidal ideation; Belief that he would meet characters from his animated web series Ember's Ghost Squad in the afterlife

On June 8, 2017, a shooting occurred at the Weis Markets supermarket in Eaton Township, Pennsylvania, United States. The perpetrator, Randy "Andrew Blaze" Stair, a 24-year-old employee, shot and killed three of his co-workers before fatally shooting himself. Investigations by Pennsylvania State Police found that Stair had maintained a significant online presence, through which he posted his suicidal ideation and hints of "something massive." Hours before the attack, he posted links to multiple files and videos documenting his planning and motivations behind the shooting.

== Background ==
=== Perpetrator ===
Randy Stair in May 2016

Randy Robert Stair (September 17, 1992 – June 8, 2017), also known online as Andrew Blaze, was employed at the Weis Markets supermarket for seven years, and lived in Dallas, Pennsylvania with his parents and brother. According to an online document he authored, he was a shy, introverted kid who felt affected whenever he was away from his parents. He grew fascinated with television series, films, music, and animations as a child, and aspired to create similar projects.

Stair had a significant online presence, primarily on YouTube and Twitter. He started creating and uploading videos on YouTube in 2008 on the YouTube channel PioneersProductions. The channel initially featured short sketches. He was highlighted in an episode of "Equals Three" by YouTuber Ray William Johnson. His videos were described as humorous and light-hearted, but "sometimes a bit mundane and boring." He was often thankful for his YouTube following, noting in one of his videos that the platform had kept him away from depression. However, by 2014, citing depression, Stair shifted direction to launch the animated series Ember's Ghost Squad, inspired by the character Ember McLain from the Nickelodeon animated series Danny Phantom, who Stair incorporated into a fictional universe he increasingly identified with. Stair worked with a group of animators and voice actors in developing the series. The series involved a fantasy world featuring mostly female characters. Nine Twitter accounts based on the series' characters were created, and the accounts conversed with each other. Besides YouTube and Twitter, he also had accounts on Facebook, Bandcamp, Instagram, DeviantArt, and had a fan wiki for the series. He was an active user to online forums dedicated to the Columbine High School massacre.

Stair began grappling with suicidal ideation after learning about McLain's death from arson, and claimed in one of his videos that McLain wanted him to murder because her "Ghost Squad [needed] more souls." After the deaths of his acquaintances between 2012–2013, he was sent into a state of depression, and had increased thoughts about death. As he grew increasingly isolated, he believed that he could no longer age beyond his twenties, and began to deteriorate due to isolation. Stair felt disconnected from reality, holding beliefs that he didn't belong in the world and that his series' characters were real. He had consistently expressed his desire to be with his created characters, specifically one named Mackenzie West, whom he believed to be his soulmate. As Stair became increasingly immersed in the fictional universe he created, he developed misanthropic views and frequently expressed his hatred for humanity and the world, often describing how he wanted to kill as many people as possible. Stair had also discussed struggling with gender dysphoria, as he described himself as "a female soul trapped in a man's body" and have consider undergoing gender-affirming surgery. He admitted in a video to his parents that he had been cross-dressing on Wednesdays whenever his parents and brother were out bowling. In Ember's Ghost Squad, he voiced Andrew Blaze, a "self-insert" character who identified as female despite her masculine first name; he claimed that the character was his true self.

=== Planning ===
In the three to four months before the shooting, Stair created numerous videos and posts on Twitter documenting his planning and motivations. On May 1, 2017, Stair posted that he planned to do “something massive” on June 9 to celebrate the ninth anniversary of his YouTube channel. In a video he posted on May 11, he showcased a pair of pistol grip shotguns, which he dubbed "Mackenzie" and "Rachael." He documented target practicing with these shotguns, a tour of the Weis Markets' supermarket, and a coin flip which determined his decision of where to commit the attack. He notes the victims he would kill were part of a "soul contract" in order for him to enter into his created world.

On the evening of June 7, hours before the shooting, Stair uploaded his final video, "The Westborough High Massacre/Goodbye." The video began by him expressing his frustration over the people involved with it, followed by him loading shotguns, using one for target practice, and kissing and fondling the loaded shotgun. The video included him praising Eric Harris and Dylan Klebold, the perpetrators of the Columbine High School massacre. An animated sequence was featured depicting himself and his characters as the perpetrating school shooters. Stair harbored a fascination for Harris and Klebold and made several references in admiration to them. Along with the video, he posted links to multiple files and videos on a file-sharing website, including a series of videos, audio recordings, and journal entries labeled as "Suicide Tapes", a journal, a Microsoft Word document listing multiple online accounts, and a purple spiral notebook with the words "Sandy Hook," "Dylan Klebold," "Eric Harris," "9/11," and "OKC" scribbled on it in reference to other massacres. At 12:37 am of June 8, he texted a suicide note to his mother, who was asleep.

== Shooting ==
Stair arrived for his late-night shift at the Weis Markets supermarket in Eaton Township, Pennsylvania, on the evening of June 7, 2017, at approximately 11:00 p.m. He proceeded to work for approximately an hour and 40 minutes while blocking several emergency exits with pallets and other items.

Stair was seen on surveillance leaving the store to block the emergency exit, using his car. After getting out of his car, at approximately 12:50 a.m, he grabbed two pistol grip pump-action shotguns that he had concealed in a duffel bag in the car. Stair re-entered the store, locking the door behind him. He walked around the store, killing three employees: Victoria Brong, Brian Hayes, and Terry Lee Sterling. He approached another coworker, Kristan Newell, but did not shoot her.

Stair proceeded to fire at the store's aisles and counters as well as shooting several propane tanks, all of which failed to explode. Around this time, Newell managed to escape from the store and call 911. Whilst Newell was on the phone, Stair fatally shot himself. A total of 59 shots had been fired; all the shotgun rounds fired came from only one of the shotguns he brought.

== Victims ==
- Victoria Todd Brong, aged 25, assistant tag manager, shot 4 times.
- Brian Hayes, aged 47, night manager and United States Navy veteran, shot 5 times.
- Terry Lee Sterling, aged 63, shop assistant, shot twice.

== Investigation ==
State troopers searched Stair's residence and seized several items including shotgun cartridges, shooting goggles, ear protectors, a gunstock, and an owner's manual. Two notebooks, drawings, cartoons, recordable discs, hard disk-drives, a flash drive, a computer, and a camera were also seized in potential evidence. State Police investigated Stair's online presence for his motives. Laura Faverty, an actress who voiced one of the Ember's Ghost Squad characters, said in an interview with WILK that she received an email from Stair posted less than an hour before the shooting. The email was a suicide note thanking Faverty and outlining the motive behind his videos. Faverty said that she didn't notice Stair's violent behavior.

Stair's mental health issues have been documented by those within the profession. Wyoming County District Attorney Jeff Mitchell states that Stair had serious mental health issues. He said that Stair's case is "a mental health situation that utterly spiraled out of control," and that his mental health issues led to the attack. Psychiatrist Matthew A. Berger said that many young killers who died by suicide, like Stair, were unable to distinguish between fiction and reality. Jeanne Rosencrance—involved in the trauma services at the Lackawanna County district attorney’s office—stated that Stair's perceived lack of awareness from others in dealing with his gender dysphoria led him to seek revenge.

Several writers have documented Stair's online presence in relation to planning his attack. The Scranton Times Tribute's writer David Singleton wrote that Stair carefully avoided revealing his plans online, although he posted about suicide and hints of "something big to come." Rosencrance said she found it difficult to fathom that none of his viewers had realized his planning. Vice wrote how Stair's collection of files was designed similarly to a press kit that would result in the files being downloaded and distributed by media publications after the shooting. The writers decided not to include them in an effort not to contribute to mass shooting contagion, and tried contacting YouTube and Twitter to remove the accounts. The former removed his account on June 10, and the latter was still up at the article's time. The writers criticized both platforms for not removing Stair's accounts immediately after the shooting and allowing his videos and posts to be spread through the internet.

== Reactions ==
The shooting garnered local and national media attention. On the evening of June 8, 2017, hundreds of people gathered at the Wyoming County Courthouse to hold a vigil in honor of the victims, with eight pastors present. Becki Hayes, the sister-in-law of victim Brian Hayes, set up a GoFundMe campaign to pay for immediate expenses. Hayes was featured on Nancy Grace's podcast Crime Stories with Nancy Grace.

Weis Markets closed the store involved in the shooting. A spokesperson said they were grieving on it, and that "the safety of our associates, our customers, and the surrounding community [were their] top priority." On June 14, Weis Markets announced the store would be reopened. The store was remodeled, and a re-opening ceremony took place on July 13. Many people who lived in the area, including families of the victims, questioned Weis' decision; some disagreed with the store's remodeling due to the shooting, while others accepted it. A spokesperson said the decision wasn't easy, but the people around the area were supportive. One man said that it would have played into Stair's hands if the store relocated, arguing that he would have wanted the store to relocate and be avoided in aftermath of the shooting.

== See also ==
- Lists of mass shootings in the United States
- List of rampage killers (workplace killings)
- 2018 Aberdeen, Maryland, shooting
- Indianapolis FedEx shooting
- Prosper family murders
