= Sida =

Sida may refer to:

- Sida (crustacean), a genus of cladoceran water fleas
- Sida (plant), a genus of flowering plants
- Security Identification Display Area, US FAA
- Swedish International Development Cooperation Agency, a Swedish governmental agency
- Acquired Immune Deficiency Syndrome (AIDS), a disease, abbreviated as SIDA in several languages
- Sidaction, a French charity organization
- Two journals published by the Botanical Research Institute of Texas
- The fruit of the Coula edulis tree, also called the Gabon nut
- Amphoe Sida, a district in Nakhon Ratchasima Province, Thailand
- Sida, a village near Gali, Abkhazia, the site of the 1997 Sida shooting
