= 2015 Tunisia attack =

2015 Tunisia attack may refer to:

- Bardo National Museum attack in March
- 2015 Tunis barracks shooting in May
- 2015 Sousse attacks in June
- 2015 Tunis bombing in November
