= Ganghwa Island shooting =

Shooting on Ganghwa Island

- Location: Ganghwa County, South Korea
- Date: July 4, 2011; 15 years ago
- Target: South Korean marines
- Attack type: Mass shooting
- Weapons: Daewoo Precision Industries K2, grenade
- Deaths: 4
- Injuries: 1
- Perpetrators: Corporal Kim Min-chan, ROKMC

The Ganghwa Island shooting occurred on July 4, 2011, at 11:50 a.m. at a coastal base in Ganghwa County when Kim Minchan, a South Korean marine corporal assigned to the South Korean 2nd Marine Division, went on a shooting spree towards his team with a K-2 rifle and later attempted a suicide with a grenade. The assault was carried out in a barracks, killing four soldiers while injuring another. Three were killed immediately while the fourth died after being taken to the hospital. One of the fatalities was an officer while the rest were rank-and-file soldiers. The victims included the cousin of South Korean actor, Im Hyeok-pil.

== Involved parties ==
- Perpetrator: Kim Minchan, Corporal (19)
- Accomplice: Jung Joonhyeok (20)
- Victims: Lee Sunghoon (25), Lee Seungryeol (20), Park Chihyeon (21), Kwon Seunghyeok (20)
- Injured: Kwon Hyeok (19)

== Investigation ==
The Republic of Korea Marine Corps formed a task force to investigate the rampage. The investigation came amid claims of alleged sexual harassment, hazing, extortion in the hierarchies, and violence occurring within the South Korean marine corps' barracks. These issues had persisted over an extended period of time and had been associated with the occurrence of repeated shooting incidents. For example, in June 2005, a young soldier threw a grenade and opened fire on his sleeping comrades at a guard post in Yeoncheon, Gyeonggi Province resulting in the death of eight soldiers. This incident was also connected to bullying conduct by senior officers.

There are also claims that the tension with North Korea is taking its toll on the soldiers stationed near the heavily fortified Demilitarized Zone. Like many marine stations on the country's front-line islands, Ganghwa is within striking distance of North Korea. A year before, one of such islands was attacked, leading to the death of four people, including two marines.

== Aftermath ==
Actor Im Hyeok-pil, whose cousin was killed in the massacre, criticized many of the South Korean politicians who evaded their conscription service for taking roles in resolving the shooting incident.

The authorities of the Republic of Korea Marine Corps announced to execute a 100-day program to promote the healthy and safe military culture within the military barracks. There is also plan to discharge marines who perpetuated acts of violence and to transfer them to other bases.

On January 13, 2012, the Republic of Korea Marine Corps General Military Court announced a ruling of the death penalty for Kim Minchan, and 20 years of imprisonment for Jung Joonhyeok, who had been arrested and indicted on suspicion of killing a higher officer. They appealed immediately after the ruling, and according to Article 406 of the Military Court Act, defendants cannot abandon an appeal in connection with rulings of the death penalty, and life imprisonment, however, "it is only that it is not possible to abandon an appeal within a fixed period of time," not that an appeal is fulfilled automatically.

On July 10, 2012, the Ministry of National Defense High Military Court maintained the original ruling from the first hearing for Kim Minchan, the perpetrator who was arrested and indicted on suspicion of killing a higher officer, and the appeal was dismissed. However, the original ruling in connection with Jung Joonhyeok was overturned and was decreased to 10 years of imprisonment. The second ruling was finalized by the Supreme Court on January 24, 2013.

== See also ==
- Hazing in the Republic of Korea Armed Forces
