= Peruvian Naval Infantry =

Branch of the Peruvian Armed Forces

- Infantería de Marina del Perú
- Coat of Arms of the Peruvian Naval Infantry
- Founded: November 6, 1821; 204 years ago
- Countries: Peru
- Type: Naval infantry
- Size: 4,000
- Part of: Peruvian Navy
- Mottos: Acción y valor (English: Action and valor)

The Peruvian Naval Infantry (IMAP) (Spanish: Infantería de Marina del Perú) is the only naval infantry brigade unit branch of the Peruvian Navy (MGP). Consisting of 4,000 personnel, the branch, which falls under the Pacific Operations General Command, includes an amphibious warfare brigade made up of three battalions, internal security units, jungle warfare unit made up of two battalions, two troopships, four landing craft and forty armoured personnel carriers. Since 1982, IMAP detachments have been deployed in anti-irregular military, counterinsurgency, and jungle warfare operations in the Ayacucho and Huancavelica departments of Peru.

== History ==
=== Founding ===
Following the creation of the Peruvian Navy on 23 October 1821, the Commander General of the Navy, Jorge Martín Guise, requested a garrison of 38 troops to be stationed at Balcarce and Belgrano. The formal request was made on 6 November 1821 to the Minister of War and Navy, creating the Navy Battalion. The Navy Brigade was later formed after another battalion was formed and on 2 June 1823, the brigade attacked the Spanish in Arica, successfully taking the city. During the War of the Confederation, the Navy Brigade fought in the Siege of Talcahuano on 23 November 1837. In 1847, President Ramón Castilla reorganized the Peruvian Navy, creating six companies of the naval infantry.

=== War of the Pacific ===
During the War of the Pacific, the Marines Garrison Battalion under the direction of the Commander General of the Navy was created on 10 January 1880 with a force of 600 men. The Marines participated in the Battle of Miraflores on 15 January 1881 with 524 marines led by Juan Fanning and Guardia Chalaca. Both of the commanders were killed along with nearly all Marines, with the infamous shout of Fanning becoming a motto of the Peruvian Marines, "¡Adelante marina, marina adelante!" or "Forward Marine, Marine forward!".

=== Modernization ===
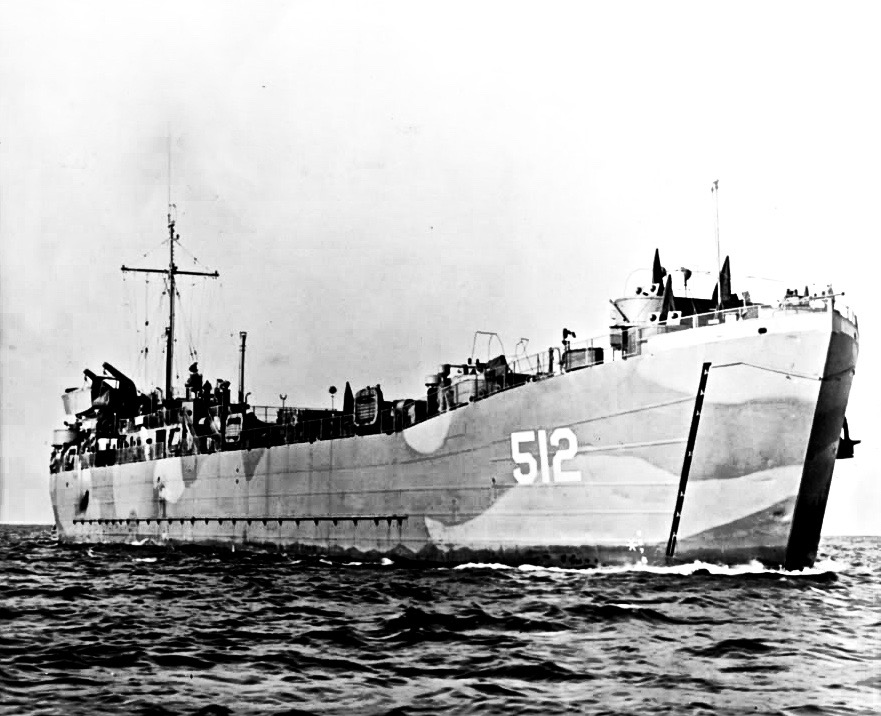
BAP Paita, (USS LST-512 in image), one of Peru's first amphibious warfare ships purchased during its modernization.

The Marines were received an update on 2 February 1919 when the Battalion of the Navy was organized into two companies of riflemen, one section of machine gunners and another section of servicemen, commanded by corvette captain Héctor Mercado. The Peruvian Navy in charge of defending the oil port of Talara then allied itself with the United States, patrolling the continent and the Panama Canal. On 9 June 1943, President Manuel Prado decreed the creation of the Infantería de Marina as part of the Naval Coast Defense Force. Through the 1950s and into the 1960s, multiple amphibious warfare ships and weapons were purchased. The Naval Station of Ancon was created on October 8, 1971, with the Amphibious Command Company headquartered there a year later providing logistical information to better organize amphibious operations.

=== Counterterrorism ===
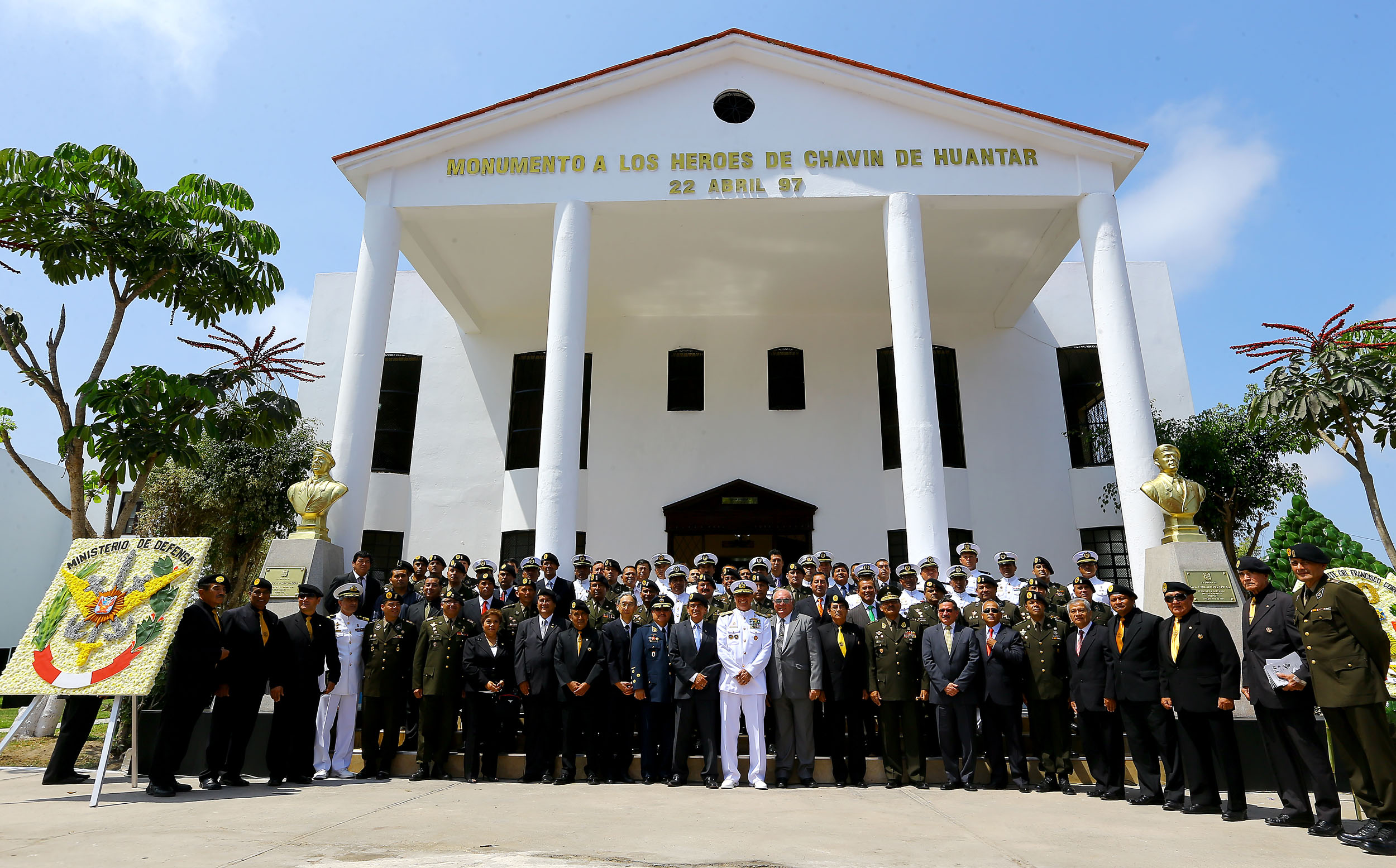
Peruvian Ministry of Defense and military personnel commemorating the operation in 2013.

Following over a decade of an authoritarian government in Peru, elections were held in 1980. Leftist armed groups arose, such as the Shining Path and later the Túpac Amaru Revolutionary Movement (MRTA). The Marines began anti-irregular military, counterinsurgency, and counterterrorist operations against such groups stationed in the Ayacucho Region from 1985 to 1991, creating Task Force 90, later expanding to Ucayali, Huánuco and Loreto. In 1995, Marines also participated in the brief the Cenepa War, a brief territorial conflict with Ecuador.

On 17 December 1996, hundreds of diplomats, businessmen, as well as government and military officers were taken hostage by the MRTA at the Japanese ambassadors residence, initiating the Japanese embassy hostage crisis. Over the year, some hostages were released, though 72 hostages remained. Peruvian Marines were then involved in a hostage rescue operation, Operation Chavín de Huántar, named after the Chavín de Huantar archaeological site due to the tunnels dug by troops to access the ambassadors compound. The operation resulted in two commandos and one hostage dead while all fourteen militants were killed.

== Organization ==
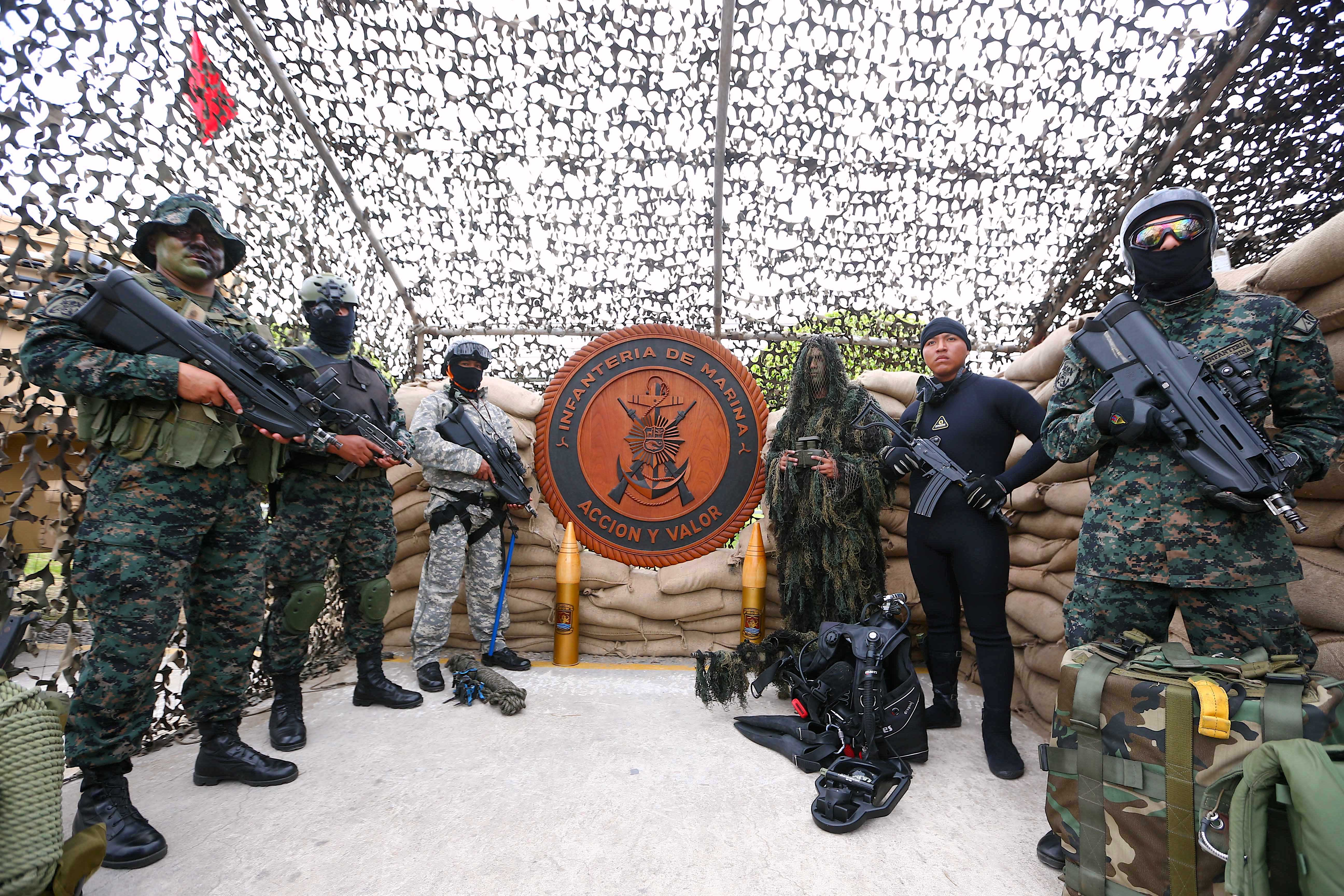
Peruvian marines of various specialities.

Brigada de Infanteria de Marina

- 1st Naval Infantry Battalion - Ancón
- 2nd Naval Infantry Battalion - Ancón
- Amphibious Support Group
- Commando Grouping
- Engineers Unit
- Fire support Group

Other units

- 3rd Naval Infantry Battalion - Tumbes
- 4th Naval Infantry Battalion - Puno
- 1st Jungle Naval Infantry Battalion - Iquitos
- 2nd Jungle Naval Infantry Battalion - Pucallpa
- Naval Infantry Detachment Litoral Sur - Mollendo
- Special Forces Espíritus Negros and Fuerza Delta, based on the American Delta Force and US Army Rangers.

== Equipment ==
=== Weapons ===
Model	Image	Caliber	Origin	Details
Pistols
Beretta 92		9×19mm Parabellum	Italy	Marine officer sidearm
Browning Hi-Power		9×19mm Parabellum	Belgium	Marine officer sidearm
Assault rifles
AKM		7.62×39mm	USSR	Used by Special Operations Forces (FOES)
Daewoo K2		5.56 × 45 mm NATO	South Korea	Standard issue rifle
Carabina SAR-21		5.56 × 45 mm NATO	Singapore	Used by Marine Special Forces
Carbon 15		5.56 × 45 mm NATO	United States	Used by Marine Special Forces
FN F2000		5.56 × 45 mm NATO	Belgium	Used by Marine Special Forces.
FN FAL 50.623		7.62×51mm NATO	Belgium	Standard issue rifle
HK-53		5.56 × 45 mm NATO	West Germany	Standard issue rifle
IMI Galil SAR		5.56 × 45 mm NATO	Israel	Used by Marine Special Forces
IMI MicroGalil		5.56 × 45 mm NATO	Israel	Standard issue rifle
IMI Tavor		5.56 × 45 mm NATO	Israel	Used by Marine Special Forces
M16A1		5.56 × 45 mm NATO	United States	Used by Special Operations Forces (FOES)
Sub-machine guns
Heckler & Koch HK21		9 x 19mm Parabellum	Germany	Used by Marine Special Forces
IMI Uzi		9 x 19mm Parabellum	Israel	Used by Marine Special Forces
FN P90		5.7 x 28 mm	Belgium	Used by Marine Special Forces
MGP		9 x 19mm Parabellum	Peru	Standard issue
Machine guns
M60		7.62 × 51 mm NATO	United States	
FN Minimi		7.62 × 51 mm NATO	Belgium	
Ultimax 100		5.56 × 45 mm NATO	Singapore	
Grenade launchers
Milkor MGL		40 × 46mm grenade	South Africa	Used as an attachment to the IMI Galil

=== Vehicles ===
Name	Image	Type	Quantity	Origin	Details
Armoured vehicles
LAV‑II		APC	32	Canada	All 32 delivered to the Amphibious Expeditionary Brigade (BEA) of the Marines in mid-2016.
BMR-600		APC	8	Spain	4 Units donated to the National Police of Peru. The rest are kept as transport for the troops of the United Nations peacekeeping missions. It is projected to go into retirement together and be replaced by a new batch of LAV II
Bravia Chaimite		APC	9	Portugal	It is projected to go into retirement together and be replaced by a new batch of LAV II
Utility vehicles
Can-Am Commander Max		Off-road vehicle		Canada	
RAM MK3		Armoured light vehicle	7	Israel	Purchased in 2016

== See also ==
- Marines
- Peruvian Navy
