= Vitalyst =

- Formerly: PC Helps
- Industry: Technology services
- Founded: 1992; 34 years ago
- Parent: Alithya
- Website: www.vitalyst.com

Vitalyst, formerly known as PC Helps, is an American technology support services firm that provides client learning and change enablement services. With its corporate headquarters in Bala Cynwyd, Pennsylvania, it has an additional call center in Cleveland, Ohio.

== Overview ==
Vitalyst provides its web-based support and on-site training for Microsoft, Apple, and other applications. The company provides IT support for technology migrations to governmental entities, including the Federal Aviation Administration, the United States Department of Transportation, and the U.S. Securities and Exchange Commission.

It offers application and device support for software applications and computers.

== History ==
Originally formed as PC Helps in 1992, the firm was based on a business plan written by Jeffrey Becker while attaining his master's degree at the Kellogg School of Management at Northwestern University. By the end of the decade, PC Helps was undertaking an expansion that allowed it to grow organically to the point of supporting over 800,000 users, including clients such as PepsiCo, Pitney Bowes, and Campbell Soups.

In September 2005, its sale to the private equity firms GI Partners and Celerity Partners was finalized, with D.B. Zwirn providing additional financing for its completion. On January 15, 2014, three years before becoming a Microsoft Gold Partner, its name was changed to Vitalyst.

In February 2022, Vitalyst was sold by Baird Capital to Alithya for a reported $50.2 million.
