= 2019 Virginia Beach shooting =

Mass shooting in Virginia, U.S.

- Location: 36.7509°N 76.0575°W; 2405 Courthouse Dr; Virginia Beach, Virginia, U.S.
- Date: May 31, 2019; 7 years ago 4:08 – 4:44 p.m. (EDT; UTC−4)
- Target: Government employees and contractor
- Attack type: Mass shooting; mass murder; shootout; workplace shooting
- Weapons: H&K USP Compact Tactical .45-caliber pistol equipped with a suppressor; .45-caliber Glock 21 pistol (unused)
- Deaths: 13 (including the perpetrator)
- Injuries: 4
- Perpetrator: DeWayne Antonio Craddock
- Motive: Perceived workplace grievances

On May 31, 2019, a mass shooting occurred at a municipal building in the Princess Anne area of Virginia Beach, Virginia, United States. The gunman, 40-year-old DeWayne Craddock, a disgruntled city employee, fatally shot 12 people and wounded four others before he was killed by responding police officers during an exchange of gunfire.

== Shooting ==
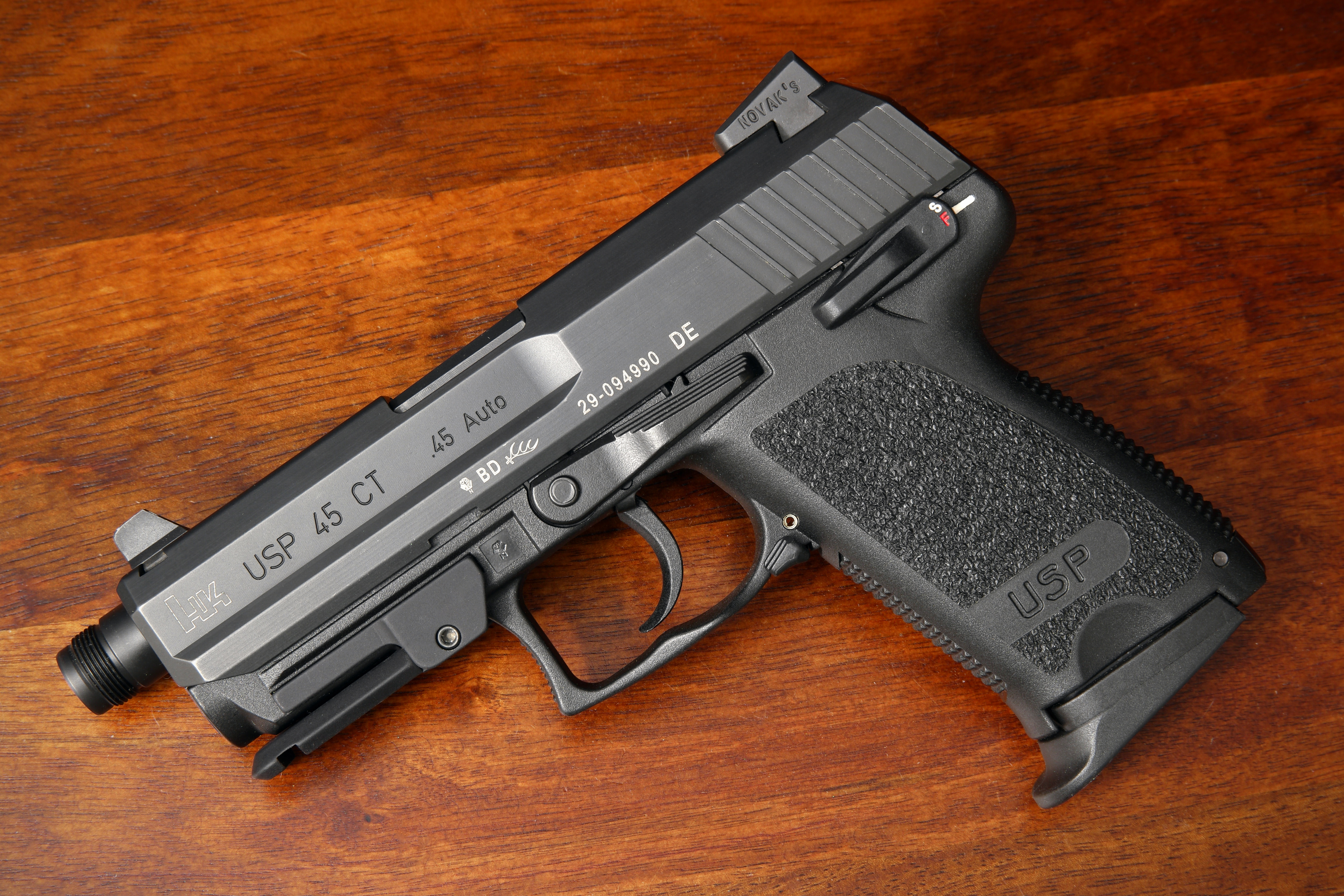
H&K USP Compact Tactical

The perpetrator fatally shot a person in a car in the parking lot of Building 2 of the Virginia Beach Municipal Center and one person on the steps before entering the building and shooting people on all three floors. The building housed the city's public works, utilities, and planning departments in an open-government facility with no additional security to enter but security passes required for accessing employee areas and conference rooms. He fired indiscriminately and there was no immediate indication that he had targeted anyone in particular. He was fatally shot during a prolonged gunfight with police who responded to the scene. An autopsy report confirmed that his cause of death was multiple gunshot wounds, and that he had no drugs in his system at the time of the attack.

Some members of the public and employees were initially unaware of the shooter, and many were alerted by phone calls, text messages, or word of mouth to shelter in place or evacuate the location. The confusion was in part due to renovations that were underway at the time leading many to believe the shots were from a nail gun or another tool. An active shooter situation at the municipal center was confirmed by an email from the Communications Office at 4:22 p.m. and the city manager around 4:40 p.m.

The police response to the shooting was slowed down due to electronic security doors that require a badge to open. The FBI, the ATF, and the United States Department of Homeland Security responded to assist local and state police. Two semi-automatic pistols, a suppressor, and multiple extended magazines were found at the scene. The perpetrator had purchased the firearms legally within the previous three years.

== Victims ==
The shooter killed 12 people. Eleven were city employees and one was a contractor in the building to obtain a permit. The employees had a combined 150 years of service, one having worked there for 41 years, another who had worked for just 11 months. Six employees worked in the public utilities department, alongside their killer. The contractor, Herbert "Bert" Snelling, would be the first person to be killed in the shooting. Snelling was sitting in his car when he was shot and killed. Four other people were injured and hospitalized, with three in critical condition; in addition, a police officer was shot in his ballistic vest.

According to Kevin Martingayle, her family's attorney, Kate Nixon, one of the victims, had contemplated bringing a pistol with her to work the night prior to the shooting due to feeling unsafe about one specific co-worker. That co-worker ended up being De'Wayne Craddock. However, she did not do so due to a city policy forbidding it. Craddock would end up shooting Nixon in the shoulder, injuring her inside of building 2. She then called her husband, Jason Nixon, to inform him that she was shot in the shoulder and told him to call 911. Craddock then came back and fatally shot her, killing her.

== Perpetrator ==
The perpetrator was identified by the police as 40-year-old DeWayne Antonio Craddock (born DeWayne Antonio Hamilton; October 15, 1978 – May 31, 2019). He was born in New Bern, North Carolina and worked as an engineer in the city's public utilities department until tendering his resignation in an email he sent to city management a few hours before the attack. Having resigned "within good standing in his department", Craddock still possessed a security pass to enter employee workspaces within the building at the time of the attack. In the days prior to the shooting, he was alleged to have been involved in physical scuffles with fellow city employees and threatened with disciplinary action. However, the city manager said that when Craddock resigned, he "had no issues of discipline ongoing".

Within the span of at least three years prior to the shooting, Craddock had legally acquired six firearms, five of which were chambered in .45 ACP. Two .45-caliber pistols (a Glock 21 and an H&K USP Compact Tactical equipped with a suppressor) were used in the shooting and three more weapons were found at his home, including one Bond Arms Backup Derringer in .45 caliber, one Just Right Carbine in .45 caliber, and another Glock 21 pistol in .45 caliber. The sixth weapon was an unidentified Ruger rifle the suspect purchased on April 12.

Craddock graduated in 1996 from Denbigh High School in Newport News. Between 1996 and 2002, he served in the Virginia Army National Guard in Norfolk as a cannon crew member with the First Battalion, 111th Field Artillery Regiment. At the time of his discharge he held the rank of Specialist (E-4) and had not been deployed for combat service. In 2002, he graduated from Old Dominion University with a degree in civil engineering.

Prior to the shooting, Craddock did not have a criminal record with the exception of minor traffic violations.

== Aftermath ==
Multiple vigils were organized for the victims of the shooting by churches and other organizations. Members of the Courthouse Community United Methodist Church prepared food for police at the scene, after it was secured.

The day after the shooting, Virginia Beach police held a news conference that included a detailed presentation on the names, photos, and job titles of the twelve victims who were killed, including the towns in which they lived. They announced the perpetrator's name only once, vowing that it would be the only time they would ever do so.

On July 2, 2019, the Virginia Beach City Council voted to order an independent investigation of the circumstances that led to the mass shooting. The decision came after the families of some of the victims expressed dissatisfaction with the information released by the authorities.

=== Reactions ===
Virginia Governor Ralph Northam tweeted, "My heart breaks for the victims of this devastating shooting, their families, and all who loved them." Virginia Beach Mayor Bobby Dyer said, "This is the most devastating day in the history of Virginia Beach." He tried to quell both sides of the gun control debate, asking all to avoid "knee jerk reaction" and "bipartisan bureaucratic malpractice." Virginia Attorney General Mark Herring said, "In recent years there have been mass shootings at American elementary schools, colleges, government buildings, offices, concerts, movie theaters, nightclubs, and even places of worship, like churches, mosques, and synagogues. We have to do more to stop this kind of violence."

Virginia's junior U.S. Senator, Tim Kaine, promised to "keep pushing for Congress to take action to prevent the daily scourge of gun violence in America." Virginia's senior U.S. Senator, Mark Warner, thanked police for their response. U.S. Representative Elaine Luria, who represents Virginia Beach, offered sympathies and thanked "first responders and law enforcement for risking their lives to bring a suspect into custody." She further said that the incident "is more proof Congress must act to prevent gun violence." U.S. President Donald Trump also offered condolences, as did House Speaker Nancy Pelosi.

== See also ==
- Washington Navy Yard shooting
- 2022 Chesapeake shooting
- List of mass shootings in the United States in 2019
- List of rampage killers (workplace killings)
- 1994 Virginia bar murders, another mass shooting in Virginia Beach
