= Hazing in the Republic of Korea Armed Forces =

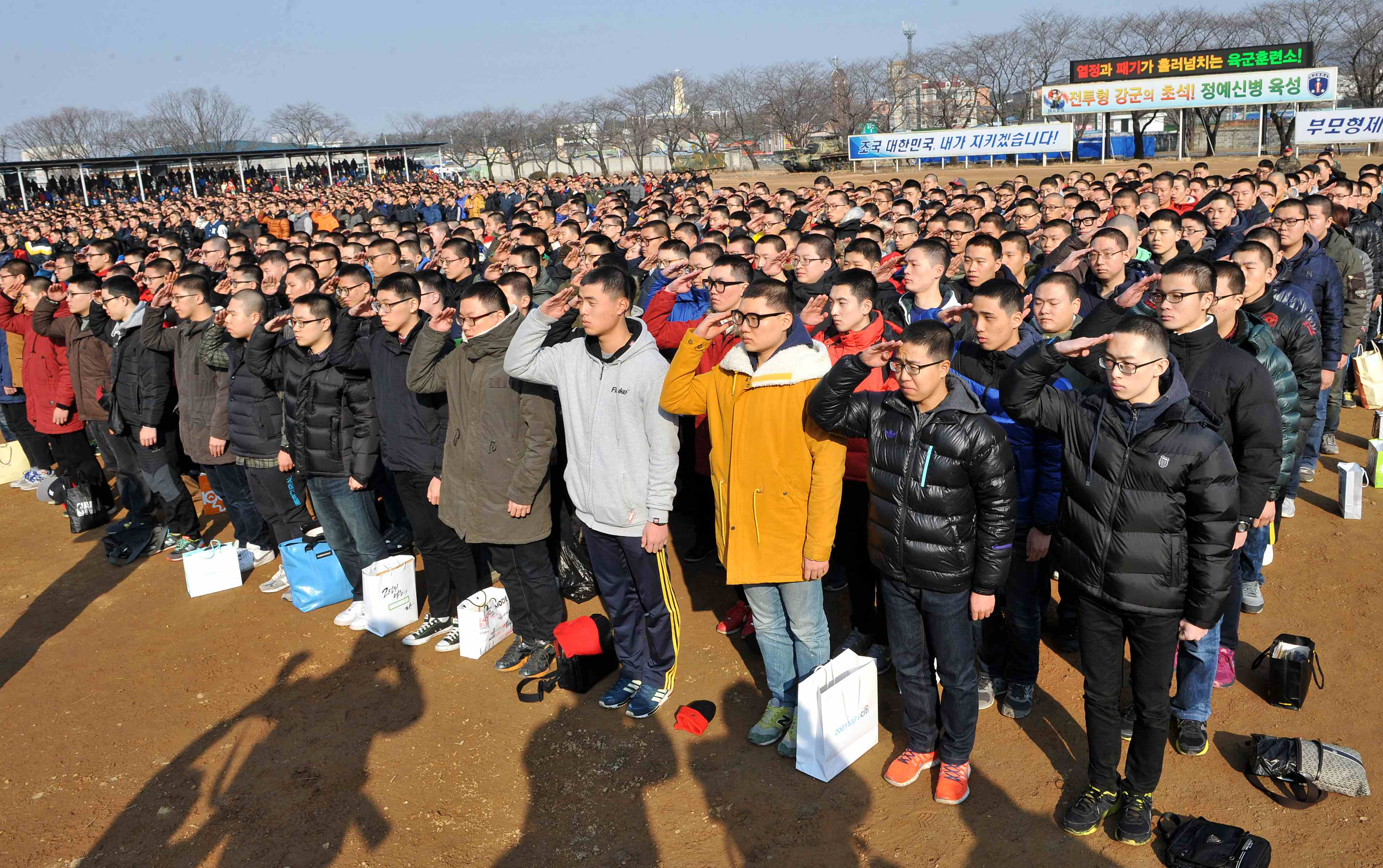
Enlistment ceremony for conscripts at the Korea Army Training Center in South Korea

There have been instances of hazing and bullying carried out in the Republic of Korea Armed Forces, often to conscripts and junior members in South Korea. Hazing has been enforced and encouraged mainly under the pretext of establishing military discipline and hierarchy. Hazing has resulted in a large number of fragging, shooting spree and suicide cases; such cases of suicide are referred to as non-combat casualties by the military.

Such hazing has ranged from physical violence to malicious harassment, sexual violence, verbal abuse, to other forms of abuse, with some even resulting in death. Other forms of hazing have also included being beaten with a heated object and being forced to eat bugs. Such hazing in the South Korean military has led to numerous major incidents, including a series of suicides and gun shootings.

== History ==
The Republic of Korea Armed Forces originates from the Korean Liberation Army, formed in response to Japanese occupation and attempts at colonization during World War II. The Ministry of National Defense (South Korea) specifies the roots of its armed forces as the Korean Liberation Army, which organized to liberate Korea from Japanese colonial rule during WWII. However, in the process of establishing the Korean Army under the command of the U.S. military government after liberation from Japanese colonial rule, military generals from Manchukuo Imperial Army and Japanese Army were at the center of the Korean Army. As such, the Japanese military culture was forced onto Korean military culture; normalizing beating, other forms of physical abuse, a strict ranking culture and hierarchy system, and an emphasis on mental perseverance by enduring harsh behavior. The same culture and values have remained as remnants of the Japanese occupation of Korea.

In addition, the system of conscription in South Korea which requires male citizens between the ages of 18 and 28 to perform compulsory military service, a lack of transparency from the South Korean military, and a larger culture of hierarchal abuse continue to perpetuate hazing in the South Korean military.

Critics have also noted that LGBT South Korean soldiers are particularly targeted and vulnerable to hazing and extreme abuse during conscription.

== Current situation ==
About 60 percent of the deaths in the South Korean military are suicides each year. According to the research, it has been confirmed that severe beatings, physical abuse, verbal abuse, and sexual violence have significant effects on the suicidal impulse of the respondent.

The following data is an annual comparison of total deaths and suicides in the military from 1994 to 2025.

	1993	1994	1995	1996	1997	1998	1999	2000	2001	2002
Total deaths	343	416	330	359	273	248	230	182	164	158
Suicides	129	155	100	103	92	102	101	82	66	79

	2003	2004	2005	2006	2007	2008	2009	2010	2011	2012
Total deaths	150	135	124	128	121	134	113	129	143	111
Suicides	69	67	64	77	80	75	81	82	97	72

	2013	2014	2015	2016	2017	2018	2019	2020	2021	2022
Total deaths	117	101	93	81	75	86	86	55	103	93
Suicides	79	67	57	54	51	56	62	42	83	70

	2023	2025
Total deaths		
Suicides	68	50

While the true cause of such high suicide rates among South Korean military soldiers have been debated, research has shown that hazing, anger, depressive symptoms, and suicidal ideation were positively linked and that hazing is a significant predictor of high levels of anger and depressive symptoms. Others have also argued that rather than the isolation of conscription into the military, a culture of hierarchy in the military and senior soldiers abusing their power are the cause of high suicide rates among South Korean military soldiers.

== Government actions ==
South Korea's Defense Ministry issued a decree in 2011 to root out hazing in the South Korean military. To ensure anonymous reporting, the agency also provides a service called Defense Help Call to receive reports of all possible crimes and violence that could lead to a suicide. The South Korean government also established a military human rights center to further ensure the human rights of South Korean military soldiers.

Recently, the South Korean government is preparing a policy to lower conscription standards for mental and physical conditions that would previously be considered exempt, as it fears that the nation's low birthrate will lead to fewer conscripts; South Korea had the lowest fertility rate in the world in 2020 and 2021. However, experts warn such actions will eventually lead to even wider problems by recruiting personnel who would not be able to adapt to the closed military.

== Notable incidents resulting from hazing ==
- June 2005 - The 28th Infantry Division (Gyeonggi-do Yeoncheon). 22-year-old Private Kim Dong Min who had been hazed by his superiors killed eight soldiers early Sunday morning at a guard post at the demilitarized zone.
- July 2011 – Marine Corporal Kim killed four in a shooting spree, and was later sentenced to death.
- July 2013 – Private Kim of the ROKAF committed suicide.
- April 2014 -. Private Yoon Seung-joo, 23, died after being beaten and denied food and sleep. Four soldiers were jailed as a result.
- June 2014 - Sergeant Im killed five at his post and was later captured after he shot himself.
- September 2015 – A Private First Class committed suicide at a guard post.
- 22 July 2017 – Infantry Private Goh committed suicide by jumping.

== See also ==
- Hazing in the military
- Conscription in South Korea
- Republic of Korea Armed Forces
- Dedovshchina
- Ganghwa Island shooting
- Human rights in South Korea
