= Alithya =

Digital technology consulting company

- Industry: Digital technologies
- Founded: 1992
- Headquarters: Montreal, Quebec, Canada
- Key people: Paul Raymond, Ghyslain Rivard
- Products: Business Advisory and Technical Services, Business Intelligence, EPM, ERP, CRM, and Big Data Services
- Website: alithya.com/en

Alithya is a North American digital strategy and technologies company. The company employs over 3,900 people in Canada, the United States and in other countries.

== History ==
Alithya was established in 1992 by Ghyslain Rivard, with the help of a dozen information technology employees from Mouvement Desjardins. Its original name was CIA. In 2020, Alithya was hired by Nemours Children's Hospital to implement Oracle cloud services in the hospital. Previous mergers with Edgewater (an enterprise systems company) and Travercent (a healthcare specialized company) enabled this contract.

=== Edgewater Technology ===
Edgewater Technology became part of the Alithya Group in November 2018 and now operates under that name. Prior to that, Edgewater Technology was a Massachusetts-based, publicly traded business (NASDAQ: EDGW) and IT consulting firm. It was founded in 1992 by Shirley Singleton and David Clancey.

In December 2000, during an incident known as the Wakefield massacre, an Edgewater employee, Michael McDermott, shot and killed seven fellow employees, for which he was sentenced to life imprisonment.

== Other acquisitions ==
Alithya's growth as a company is in part due to their acquisitions. In 2015, TELUS invested in Alithya, which acquired its professional services and later on, its Managed Web Services. Following the acquisition of Edgewater in 2018, 35% of Alithya’s current revenue came from the U.S. Simultaneously, the company raised C$52.8 million through the issuance of 11,736,055 subscription receipts. Vitalyst was acquired in 2022.
