= 2015 Tunis barracks shooting =

Tunis barracks shooting
- 2015 Tunis barracks shooting (Tunisia) Tunisian soldiers were killed
- Location: 36°48′25″N 10°9′2″E; Tunis, Tunisia
- Date: 25 May 2015
- Attack type: Mass murder, mass shooting
- Weapons: Assault rifle; Knife
- Deaths: 9 (including the perpetrator)
- Injuries: 9
- Perpetrator: Mehdi Jemaii
- Motive: Unknown, purportedly personal issues

On 25 May 2015, a mass murder took place at the Bouchoucha military base in Tunis. A Tunisian soldier, later identified as Corporal Mehdi Jemaii, who was forbidden from carrying weapons, stabbed a soldier, then took his weapon. He then opened fire on soldiers during a flag-raising ceremony, killing seven and wounding ten, including one seriously injured who died on May 31, before he was killed during an exchange of gunfire.

The army claimed Mehdi Jemaii had "family and psychological problems," and brushed off assertions the attack was terror-related, calling it an "isolated incident". The shooting happened two months after the Bardo National Museum attack.

== See also ==
- 2009 Fort Hood shooting
- 2014 Fort Hood shootings
- List of rampage killers (workplace killings)
