= 2018 Aberdeen, Maryland, shooting =

Mass shooting in Maryland, U.S.

Aberdeen, Maryland shooting
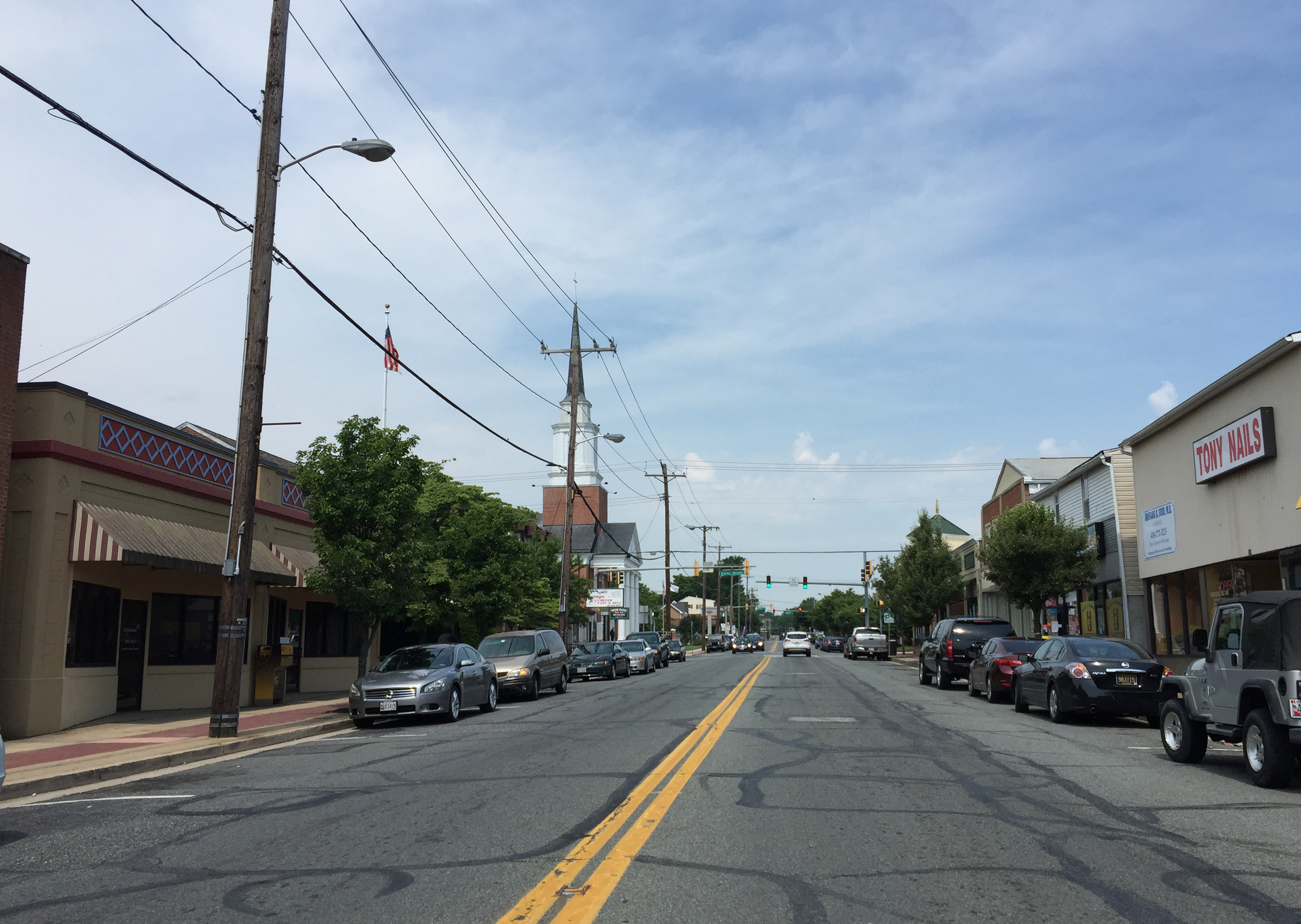
- Downtown Aberdeen
- Location: 39.4516°N 76.2087°W; Aberdeen, Maryland, US
- Date: September 20, 2018; 9:06 a.m. (EDT)
- Attack type: Workplace shooting, mass shooting
- Weapon: 9mm Glock 17 semi-automatic pistol
- Deaths: 4 (including the perpetrator)
- Injuries: 3
- Perpetrator: Snochia Moseley
- Motive: Unknown

On September 20, 2018, four people (including the perpetrator) were shot and killed at a Rite Aid distribution center in Aberdeen, Maryland, United States. This was the eighth mass shooting in Maryland in 2018, according to the Gun Violence Archive.

== Incident ==
At 6:30 am, the suspect entered the facility to report to work as usual. However, an altercation occurred when she cut in line to clock in for work. She left the facility at 7:21 am and returned to the parking lot at 8:35 am. She brought her Glock handgun, a pepper spray, handcuffs, and three magazines. She reentered the facility at 8:53 am. At 9:05 am, the shooter exited the building through the front door, pulled a hood over her head, before pulling out the handgun. The shooting began during breaktime and the first people shot at were a group of people standing outside the building. The shooter fired several times at the group, but was only able to fatally shoot Sunday Aguda. The shooter then reentered the building and shot Hayleen Reyes to death in the lobby. She entered the break room and opened fire on several people eating breakfast, killing Brindra Giri and wounding three men. After opening fire in the break room, the shooter killed herself with two shots in the head.

The Harford County sheriff stated that calls of "shots fired" came from the Rite Aid distribution center at approximately 9:06 am. EDT. Deputies responded at 9:09 am. Officers reportedly never discharged their weapons while responding to the scene. Agents from the Baltimore offices of the Bureau of Alcohol, Tobacco, Firearms and Explosives (ATF) and the FBI responded to the scene.

== Victims ==
Casualties
1. Sunday Aguda, 44 (deceased)
2. Brindra Giri, 41 (deceased)
3. Hayleen Reyes, 21 (deceased)
4. Purna Achary, 46 (injured)
5. Hassan Mitchell, 19 (injured)
6. Wilfredo Villegas, 45 (injured)

Preliminary reports suggest that at least three people were killed in the attack, although the Harford County Sheriff declined to give a precise number of wounded and deceased victims during the press conference. Two victims died at the scene and two in the hospital. It was later reported that the suspect died at the hospital due to a self-inflicted gunshot wound to their head.

Victims were transported to Johns Hopkins Bayview Hospital in Baltimore and Christiana Hospital in Delaware. Johns Hopkins Bayview Medical Center Trauma Director released a statement that the hospital received four victims with gunshot wounds, and by 2:30 pm. ET, two patients were stable and two were seriously injured.

== Perpetrator ==
The shooter was admitted to the hospital, and officials did not immediately identify the suspect. It was confirmed that per initial sweeps of the site the suspect was armed with a single 9mm Glock 17 handgun. Later, the Harford County Sheriff's Office revealed the identity of the shooter as being Snochia Moseley, 26, of Baltimore County who was a temporary worker at the facility. Moseley shot herself in the head and later died of her wounds at the hospital. The Washington Post reported that Moseley "had been beset for years by mental illness as well as emotional turmoil related to her struggle with sexual identity, according to authorities and a close friend." The Baltimore Sun reported that Moseley's friends referred to her as a transgender male.

== Response ==
After the shooting, a reunification center was set up at a fire department in Havre de Grace.

Maryland Governor Larry Hogan used Twitter to express his condolences and thoughts on the situation and tweeted "We are closely monitoring the horrific shooting in Aberdeen. Our prayers are with all those impacted, including our first responders."

Rite Aid released a statement emphasizing their continuation to work closely with authorities as the investigation continued, and stating that the company would provide grief counselors as long as needed. The company also offered their thoughts and prayers to all those involved in the situation.

== See also ==
- 2018 Cincinnati shooting
