= Daewoo Precision Industries K2 =

South Korean assault rifle

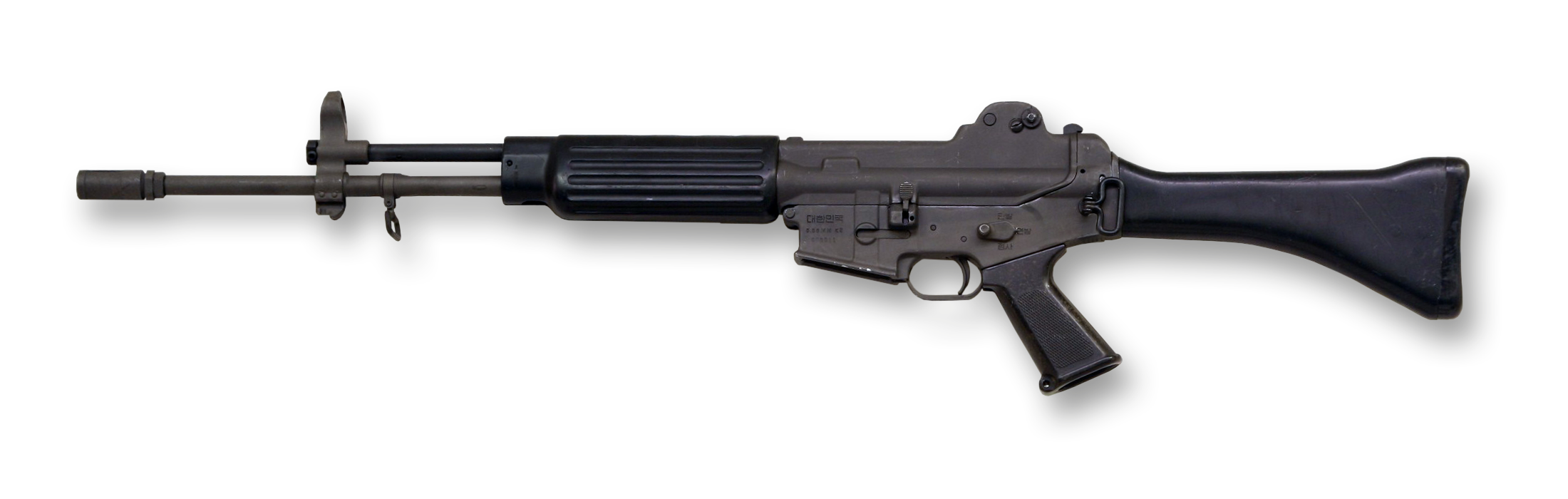
- The K2 rifle
- Type: Assault rifle (K2 & K2C1); Carbine (K2C)
- Place of origin: South Korea

Service history
- In service: 1985–present
- Used by: See Users
- Wars: Gulf War; United Nations Operation in Somalia II; War in Afghanistan; Iraq War; Conflict in the Niger Delta; 2006 Fijian coup d'état Iraqi insurgency War in Iraq; Syrian Civil War

Production history
- Designer: Agency for Defense Development; Daewoo Precision Industries
- Designed: 1972–1983
- Manufacturer: Daewoo Precision Industries (1982–1999); Daewoo Telecom (1999–2002); Daewoo Precision (2002–2006); S&T Daewoo (2006–2012); S&T Motiv (2012–2021); SNT Motiv (2021–present); Dasan Machineries (2016–present)
- Unit cost: US $727.00
- Produced: 1982–present
- Variants: See Variants

Specifications
- Mass: K2: 3.4 kg (7.5 lb) (w/o magazine) K2C: 3.3 kg (7.3 lb) (w/o magazine) K2C1: 3.6 kg (7.9 lb) (w/o magazine)
- Length: K2: 980 mm (39 in) (extended); 730 mm (29 in) (folded) K2C: 880 mm (35 in) (extended); 790 mm (31 in) (retracted); 630 mm (25 in) (folded) K2C1: 1,014 mm (39.9 in) (extended); 940 mm (37 in) (retracted); 730 mm (29 in) (folded)
- Barrel length: K2 & K2C1: 465 mm (18.3 in); K2C: 310 mm (12 in)
- Cartridge: 5.56×45mm NATO.223 Remington
- Action: Gas operated, Rotating bolt (long-stroke piston)
- Rate of fire: 700–900 rounds/min
- Muzzle velocity: 915 m/s (3,000 ft/s) (K100); 875 m/s (2,870 ft/s) (K101); 964 m/s (3,160 ft/s) (KM193); 75.3 m/s (247 ft/s) (K200 & KM433 grenades)
- Effective firing range: 600 m (K100, K2 & K2C1); 500 m (K100, K2C); 460 m (KM193)
- Maximum firing range: 3,300 m (K100); 2,653 m (KM193)
- Feed system: Various STANAG Magazines.
- Sights: Iron sights

Daewoo Precision Industries K2 assault rifle is the service rifle of the South Korean military. It was developed by the South Korean Agency for Defense Development and manufactured by SNT Motiv (formerly Daewoo Precision Industries) and Dasan Machineries (since 2016). Shoulder-fired and gas-operated, the K2 is capable of firing both 5.56×45mm NATO and .223 Remington ammunition; however, using .223 Remington is only recommended for practicing for short distance.

The K2 supplanted the M16A1 assault rifle as the primary infantry weapon for the South Korean military since its adoption in 1985, though the former remains in service with reservists.

== Development ==
In the 1960s, the Republic of Korea Armed Forces relied completely upon military support from the United States to supply its small arms, consisting mostly of M1 Garands and M1/M2 carbines. Attempts at the time to develop an indigenous rifle were hampered by the country's economic, technological, and industrial shortcomings, and initial attempts never went into production. During South Korean involvement in the Vietnam War, South Korean Army soldiers and Marines received the more modern M16A1 assault rifle from U.S. military aid, though not enough to arm all active military personnel. With a modern rifle design and rapid economic growth in the 1970s, South Korea began to build the M16A1 (Colt Model 603K) under license in 1974.

Despite being able to produce their own service rifle, it was not an ideal arrangement; the original license agreement did not cover enough weapons to equip their forces including millions of reserves, and having to pay license fees to manufacture the design was too expensive at a time when the country was short on foreign currency. Geopolitical considerations played a factor, as the Nixon Doctrine and Carter administration's use of the U.S. military presence on the Korean Peninsula as leverage to force change against South Korea's human rights practices. Under such influences, South Korea felt it necessary to be able to indigenously meet their own basic weapon needs. Facing the eventual expiration of the license to produce the M16A1, president Park Chung Hee, who strongly believed in self-reliance in national defense, ordered the development of an indigenous standard military firearm.

An indigenous rifle program started in 1972. Initial requirements were for prototypes to be chambered in 7.62×51mm NATO as it was the only standardized ammunition for the Western Bloc. Prototypes XB-1 through XB-5 were akin to AR-15-series rifles with some exterior changes; designers attempted to use as many M16 components as possible to save time and money, such as the direct gas impingement operation, sights and handguards. In 1975, the XB-6 prototype with long-stroke gas piston was created, and converted into 5.56×45mm NATO chambered XB-7 in 1977.

By 1982, the final prototype model XB-7C (XK2) was completed, and small amount was delivered for field tests. It went into full-scale production and was officially fielded to the Republic of Korea Armed Forces in 1985.

=== K2C ===
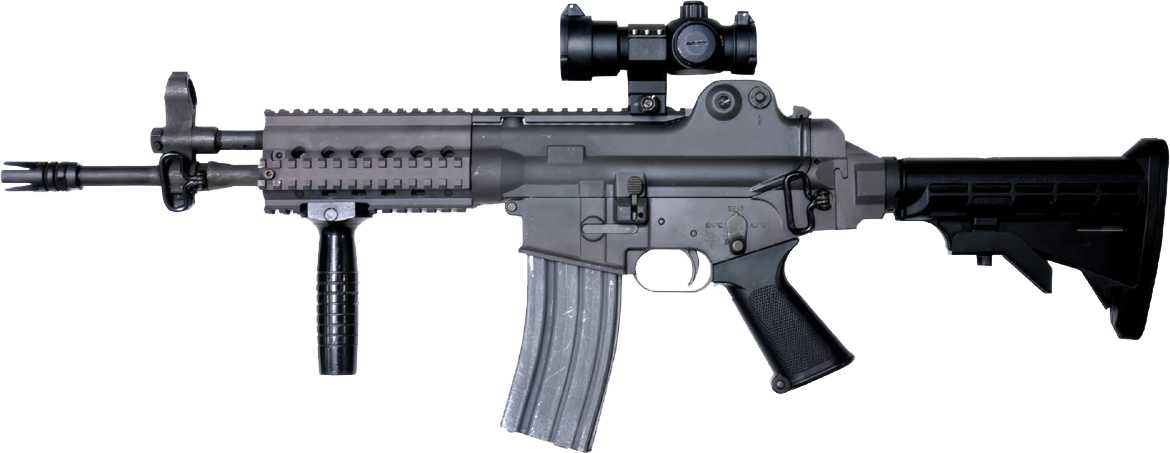
Carbine version K2C mounted with vertical foregrip and sights

After the K2 was adopted, hardly any changes were made to the gun for nearly 30 years. There were several reasons for this: the ROK Army maintained a Cold War-style mentality that favored tanks and artillery against an outdated North Korean threat, leaving less money and urgency to modernize infantry weapons and tactics; the manufacturer had been producing tens of thousands of rifles each year since the 1970s without competition for domestic customers that didn't request upgrades, leaving no motivation to make changes; and various management and ownership changes created internal chaos making it difficult to conduct research and development. Special forces units had more of a need to upgrade K-series weapons with new optics and accessories, so they turned to private companies to develop add-on rail systems. Because they were being supplied many non-standard rails from various companies, the regular ROK Army standardized the MIL-STD-1913 rail in 2013 for the PVS-11K red dot sight, which on the K2 is only a short rail on the upper receiver, since it is made with an optics mount on the receiver to attach it and regular troops have less of a need for additional rails.

The K2 and K1A had become outdated for international markets after 2000; in addition to lack of ability to add accessories, the K1A had become too large, underpowered and un-ergonomic as a personal defense weapon or special operation carbine and the K2 was too long. In 2012, S&T Motiv introduced the K2C, or K2 Carbine. It has a shortened 310 mm (12 in) barrel with adjusted gas piston, upper receiver/handguard Picatinny rail, and right side-folding M4-style retractable stock; it weighs 3.3 kg (7.3 lb), is 880 mm (35 in) long with stock extended and 630 mm (25 in) with stock folded. In 2013, a new tan-painted K2C with Magpul CTR stock and detachable rear sight was unveiled, but not actually produced. In 2017, The New K2C-1/2 variants with a foldable front sight and ambidextrous selector switches were unveiled. In 2018, the new K2C-1 variant was renamed K2C CQB (Close-quarters battle).

=== K2C1 ===
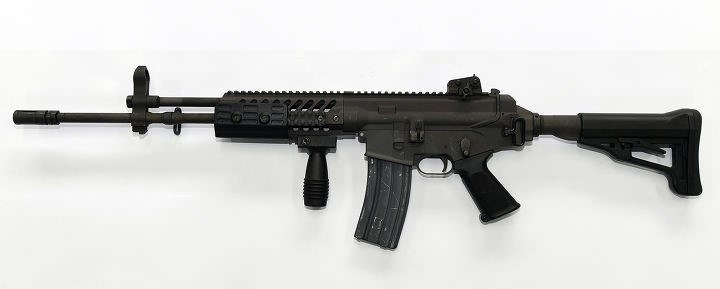
K2C1 assault rifle with mounted vertical foregrip

S&T Motiv developed the K2A to enhance its domestic appeal, which retained the full-length K2's features (including bayonet lug) and utilized the upgrades of K2C, such as the Picatinny rail on the upper receiver and handguard, as well as an Colt M4-style collapsible stock. It is slightly heavier than the original model, partly due to the screw attachment method of its rail, weighing 3.6 kg (7.9 lb), while the original K2 weighed 3.4 kg (7.5 lb). Afterward, the K2A was renamed to K2C1. The "C" in the name represented that only the exterior was modified, without any enhancements made to its performance, in accordance with the Korean Defense Specifications (KDS). Subsequently, the K2C1 was selected by the ROK forces as their standard weapon. The K2C1 underwent various changes compared to the K2A, which included an extended handguard rail with optional lower and side Picatinny rail sections, a flattop upper receiver featuring a detachable rear backup sight, and a new Magpul CTR-like collapsible stock. As of 2016, approximately 200,000 K2C1s were in active service with frontline troops.

== Design ==
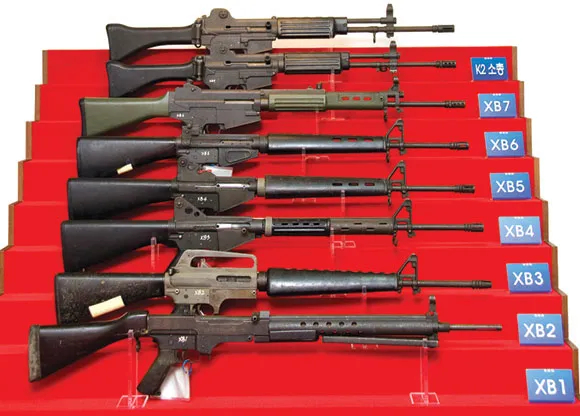
K2 and experimental prototype rifles on display

Six different prototypes were made during the XB development. Of the 6 designs, the XB6 was selected. Some parts of the XB6 resembled the FN FNC such as the suppressor and sights. Further development of the XB6 evolved into the XB7 and finally the XB7C, also known as the XK2. Externally similar in appearance to the AR18, the K2 uses polymer for the forearm, pistol-grip and side-foldable buttstock. The fire control system and bolt carrier group are derived from the American M16 rifle. The gas operating system is derived from the Russian AKM rifle. The K2 uses the same magazine as the M16. The barrel rifling has 6 grooves, 185 mm (1-in-7.3) right hand twist. The K2 has 3 selective firing modes: semi-auto, 3-round burst, and full automatic.

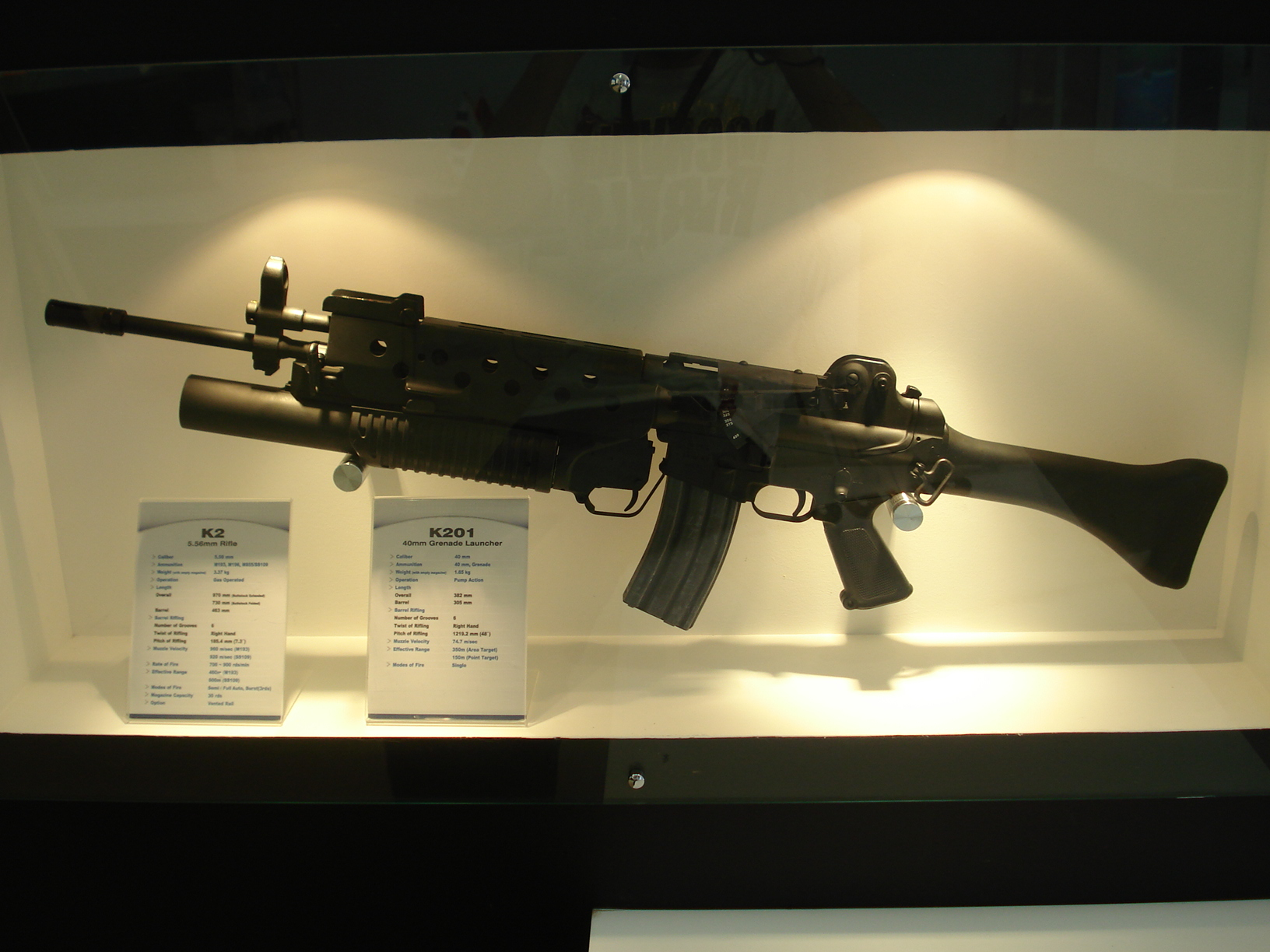
K2 rifle with a K201 under-barrel grenade launcher

The K2 can be equipped with the DPI K201, an under-barrel 40×46mm single shot grenade launcher patterned after the American M203. The Republic of Korea Armed Forces originally planned to replace the entire K2 with new S&T Daewoo K11 dual-barrel air-burst weapon. However, high cost and skepticism over the effective firepower of the 20mm grenade led to the decision to provide 2 K11s to each squad, keeping 2 grenadiers as well. Consequently, the standard 9-person infantry squad of the Republic of Korea Armed Forces is currently equipped with 2 K2 rifles, 2 K2 rifles with K201 grenade launcher, 2 K11 DAWs, 1 K3 light machine gun, and the rest with either K1 or K2.

The K2 is also sometimes used with bipods and 4× magnification scopes, in a role similar to the designated marksman rifle. A more modern way to accessorize the K2 and K1 is to mount a now (limited) standard issue PVS-4K Rail Integration System. It consists of an aluminum body with a long, uninterrupted rail for optical/red-dot and night-vision sights and three other rails located on the bottom and both sides. The rails are of the Picatinny-type.

The K2 is also able to accept a brass catcher basket, as the South Korean army requires its soldiers to pick up and return empty cartridge cases after training sessions, both for financial reasons (the brass cases are recyclable) and for security reasons, as the soldier must prove he or she has actually expended the issued ammunition. This minimizes the risk of a soldier keeping unauthorized live ammunition which could be used in criminal activities.

=== K1 and K2 weapons systems ===
When personnel from the South Korean army special command were invited to see the XB-series prototypes, they requested the development of a new submachine gun to quickly replace a series of different weapons in their use. With no time to develop a new weapon, ADD made one based on the XB rifle prototypes called XB-S (short). It used a direct impingement gas tube rather than a piston to achieve the required short length, which was faster to make since they had short-barrel CAR-15 designs to work off of and no time to redesign a new short gas piston. The barrel used 1:12 inch rifling to fire M193 rounds, as during its development there were no plans to adopt SS109 ammunition in the South Korean army. The shortened design was adopted as the K1A in 1981 and issued to special forces, commanders, radio operators and others who needed a short SMG-like weapon.

While the K1A is commonly regarded as an shorter version of the K2, the K1 is a separate weapon altogether. The primary differences between the two weapons include: development time and intent (the K1 took less time to develop and entered service sooner than the K2, and despite being technically a carbine-length rifle was designated as a submachine gun because it was intended to replace the M3 Grease Gun; while the K2 was developed from the start as a service rifle); rifling (K1: 1-in-12 twist; K2: 1-in-7.3 twist); and gas system (the K1 uses a direct impingement gas system, while the K2 uses a long stroke gas piston system). In addition, some parts are not interchangeable between the two weapons even though they can use the same cartridge (KM193 (.223 Remington) 5.56 caliber; the K2 can also utilize the K100 (SS109) 5.56 caliber round).

== Specifications ==
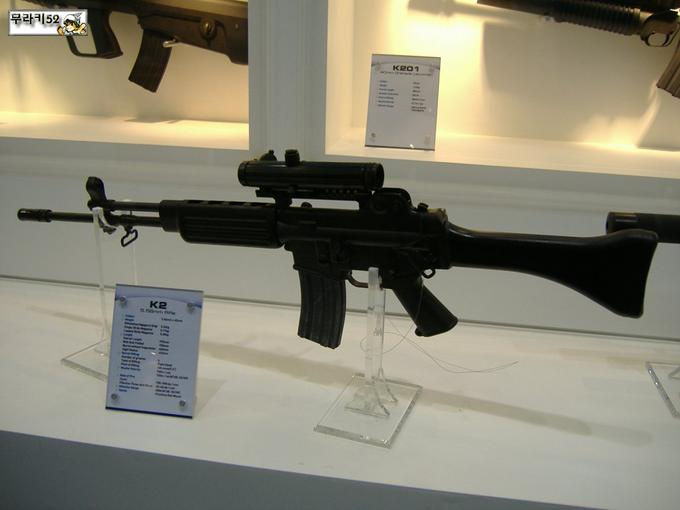
K2 rifle with scope attached

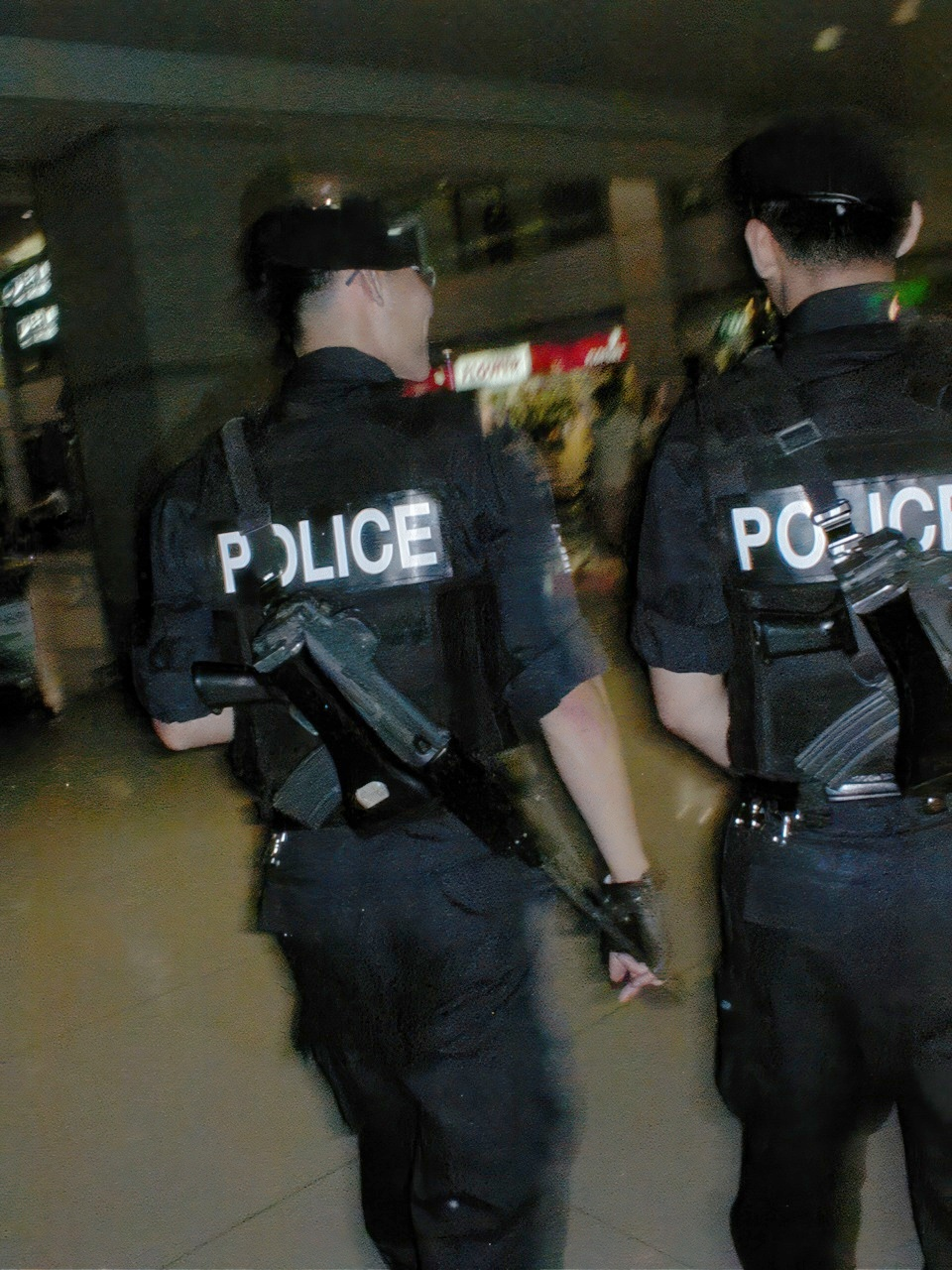
KNP combat police officers armed with Daewoo K2s. Note the folded buttstock.

		K2	K2C	K2C1	K2C1-SB
Caliber		5.56×45mm NATO			
Cartridges		K100 (SS109) / K101 / K102 / M193 / M196			
Weight		3.37 kg (7.4 lb)	3.3 kg (7.3 lb)	3.684 kg (8.12 lb)	3.3 kg (7.3 lb)
Operating system		Gas operated			
Length	Barrel	465 mm (18.3 in)	310 mm (12 in)	465 mm (18.3 in)	310 mm (12 in)
Length	Stock extended	None	875 mm (34.4 in)	1,014 mm (39.9 in)	854 mm (33.6 in)
Length	Stock retracted	980 mm (39 in)	777 mm (30.6 in)	940 mm (37 in)	780 mm (31 in)
Length	Stock folded	730 mm (29 in)	570 mm (22 in)	730 mm (29 in)	570 mm (22 in)
Barrel rifling	Number of grooves	6 Nos			
Barrel rifling	Twist of rifling	Right hand			
Barrel rifling	Pitch of rifling	185.4 mm (7.30 in)			
Muzzle velocity		K100: 920 m/s (3,000 ft/s); K101: 875 m/s (2,870 ft/s); K102: 965 m/s (3,170 ft/s); M193: 960 m/s (3,100 ft/s); M196: 949 m/s (3,110 ft/s)	825 m/s (2,710 ft/s)	K100: 920 m/s (3,000 ft/s); M193: 960 m/s (3,100 ft/s)	K100: 820 m/s (2,700 ft/s)
Rate of fire		700–900 rounds/min			
Effective range		K100: 600 m (660 yd); M193: 460 m (500 yd)	K100: 500 m (550 yd)	K100: 600 m (660 yd)	K100: 500 m (550 yd)
Maximum range		3,300 m (3,600 yd)	Unknown	3,300 m (3,600 yd)	Unknown
Fire control		Safe–Semi–Auto–Burst			
Magazine capacity		20rds / 30rds			
Option		Picatinny rail mount	Custom parts		

== Variants ==
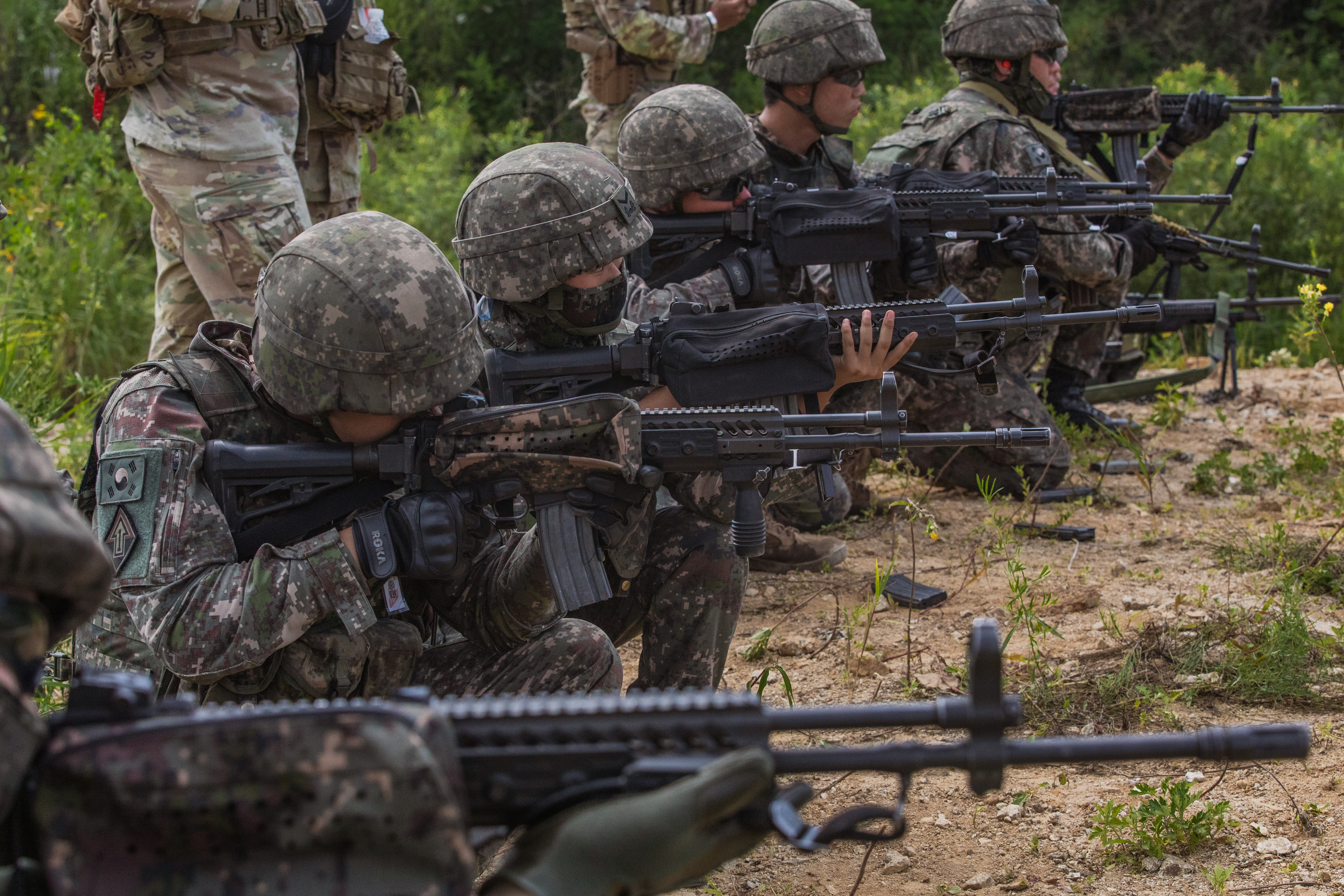
Korean soldiers assigned to ROK Army’s 1st Armored Brigade fire K2C1 assault rifles during a combined arms live fire exercises at Nightmare Range, near Pocheon, South Korea, August 14, 2024.

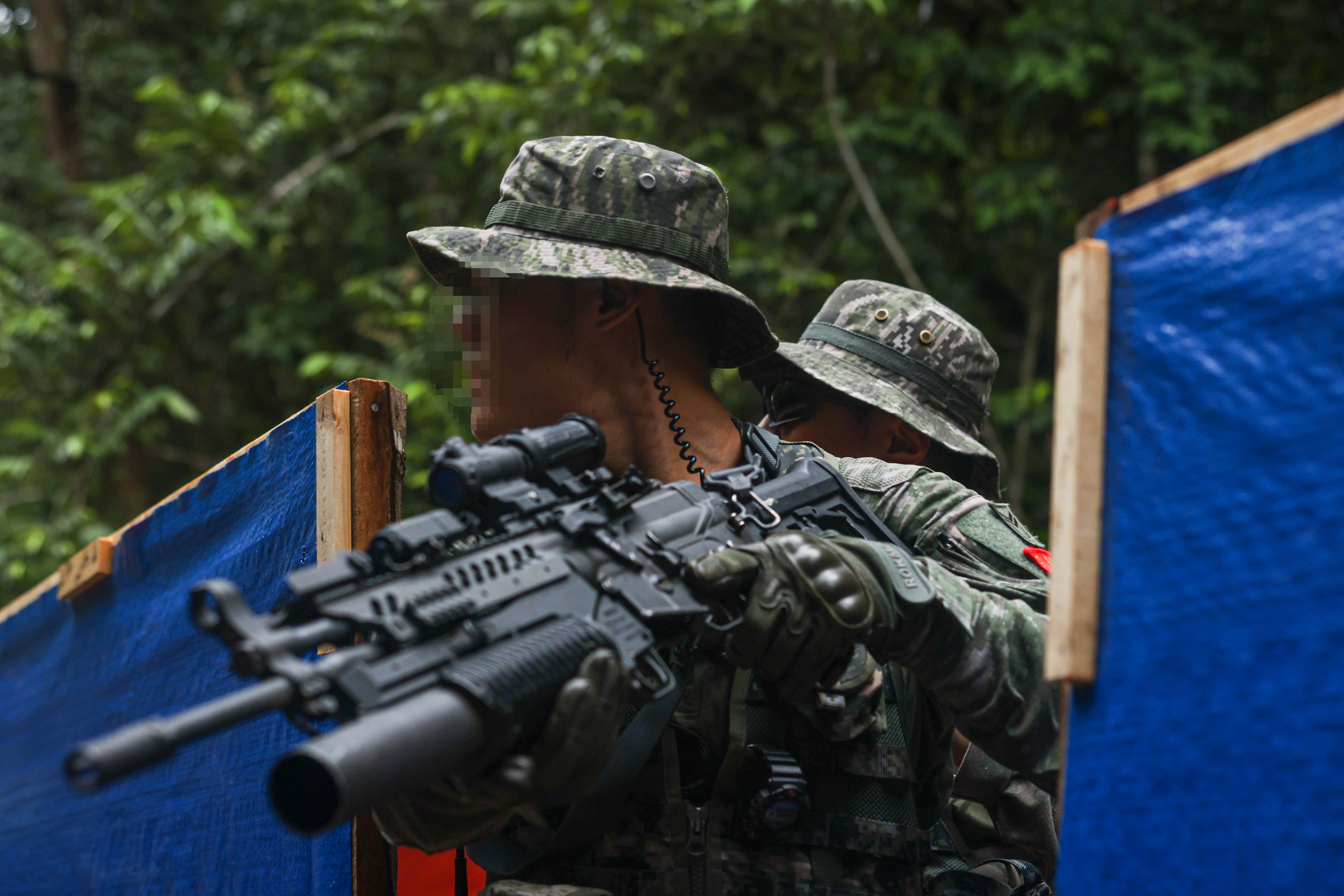
A Republic of Korea Marine personnel with his K2C1, equipped with optical sight, laser and K201 under barrel grenade launcher

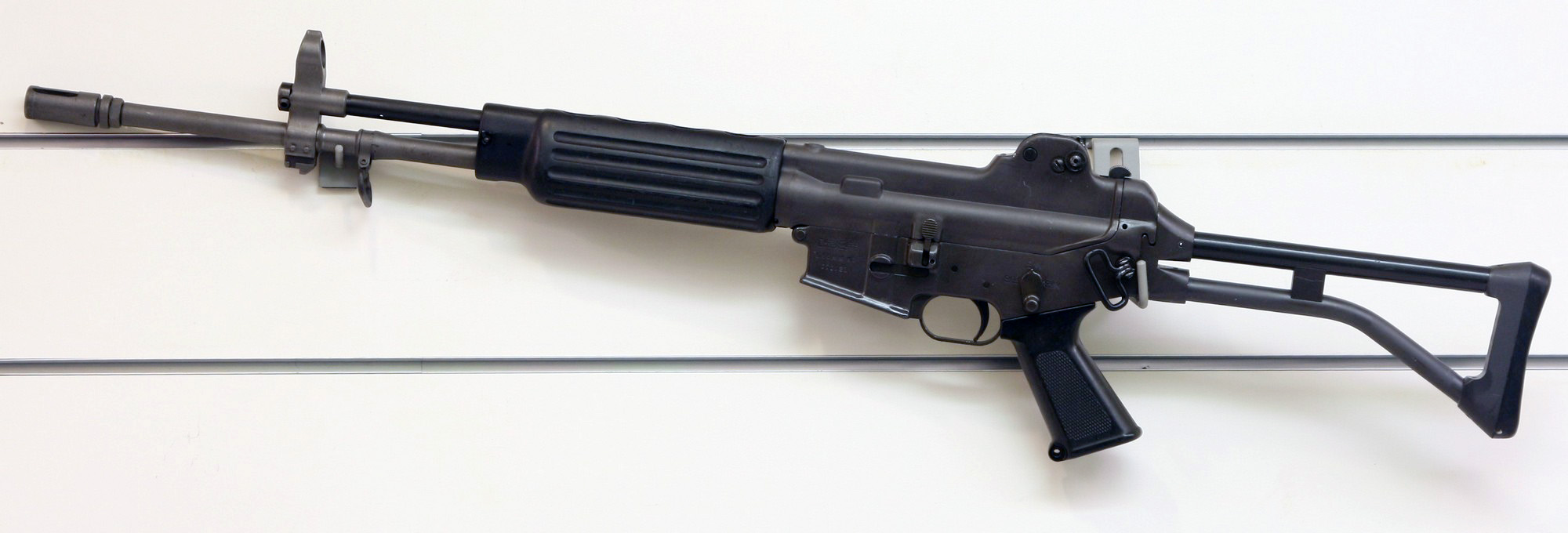
Early version K2 rifle

=== XB ===
At least 6 versions (XB1 to XB6) of prototype were made.

- XB6: Selected design among the prototype.
- XB7: Further development of the XB6.
  - XB7C: Final experimental prototype. Also known as XK2.

=== K2 ===
Mass-produced variant.

- K2/AR-100: Semi-automatic 5.56×45mm NATO version for US civilian market
- DR-100/DR-200: Semi-automatic 5.56×45mm NATO version for US civilian market post 1989 import ban of non "sport" foreign semi-automatic rifles . Primarily difference of a thumb-hole stock in place of the original folding stock.
- DR-300: Semi-automatic 7.62×39mm version for civilian market.

K2C (C="Carbine"): Carbine version of K2 rifle with Picatinny rail, M4-type buttstock, barrel reduced to 310 mm (12 in). Exports started in 2012.

- K2C CQB: A manufacturer-proposed variant of K2C for close quarters combat operations, which was first unveiled by the name "The New K2C-1" in the ADEX 2017, and later renamed as "K2C CQB" in the DX KOREA 2018. It has a 310 mm (12 in) barrel and has a firing range up to 500 meters with a Colt SCW-type buttstock, flip up sights, a horizontally modified magazine well angle, integrated picatinny rails and ambidextrous selector switches.

=== K2C1 ===
(C="Exterior design changed without performance improvements", by the South Korean Defense Specification) : New variant featuring a quad accessory rail, full-length 1913 Picatinny optics rail, an AR-15-style six position collapsing and a Magpul-based foldable stock. Comes in two barrel lengths, 305 mm (12 in) and 465 mm (18.3 in). It was officially sent into production in March 2016 with first deliveries in June 2016.

== Replacement versus upgrades ==
S&T Daewoo (now S&T Motiv) proposed the XK8, a 5.56×45mm NATO bullpup version of the K2 in early 2000. After a series of field tests, the XK8 was rejected by the South Korean military and was never mass-produced.

In 2014, an upgraded K2 rifle, the K2C1 was introduced, and the South Korean Army performed field tests which were successful. K2C1 mass production began in 2015 to replace the K2 as the standard-issue rifle for the ROK armed forces. Additional production of K2C1 rifles will push out K2 in active service, and eventually replace the reserve forces' M16A1s with K2 in the near future.

The development of the S&T Daewoo K11 dual-barrel air-burst weapon, which uses 5.56×45mm NATO and 20×30mm air-burst grenade, prompted the South Korean military to plan for the replacements of all K2 rifles in service with the K11, making K11 the standard service rifle for the armed forces. However, due to the K11's extremely high cost and weight for a standard rifle, the armed forces scrapped its original plan and decided to provide 2 K11 per squad in order to increase firepower. The K11 project was subsequently cancelled and as a result, the K2 was retained as the standard service rifle.

== Users ==
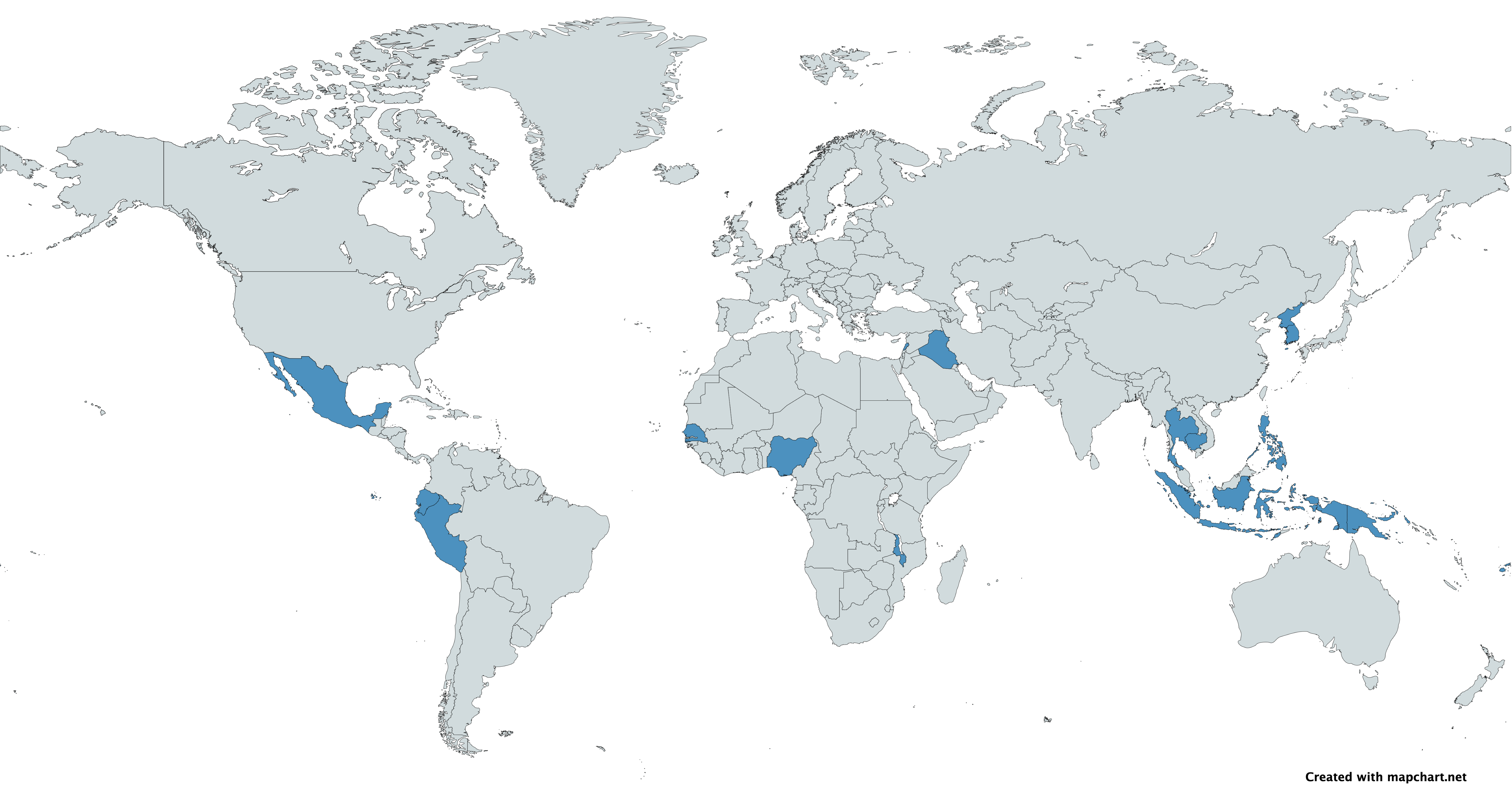
Map with users of the Daewoo Precision Industries K2 in blue

- Cambodia: The K2s were provided to the 911th Special Forces Regiment in 2012. The K2Cs were also purchased for the special forces. 128 K2s transferred according to a 2019 SIPRI small arms report.
- Ecuador: Purchased in 2011.
- Fiji: Purchased in the late 1980s.
- Indonesia: 210 K2 rifles purchased in 2008 and 2011. 806 K2s transferred according to a 2019 SIPRI small arms report.
- Iraq: K2C used by Iraqi special operations forces Golden Division (formerly Golden Brigade).
- Lebanon: Used by the Lebanese Army.
- Malawi: Purchased 1,100 K2 and 1,000 K2C in 2012. 5,200 K2C delivered in 2012-2013. Known to be used by Malawian soldiers in the United Nations Force Intervention Brigade.
- Mexico: Purchased in 2011.
- Nepal: 30,000 K2C1 rifle bought from South Korean Daewoo Precision Industries in 2022.
- Nigeria: Purchased 3,000 in 1984, which were delivered in 1985. Another batch was purchased in 1996. Additional 30,000 rifles were sold in 2006.
- North Korea: Used by Special Forces at least since the 1990s. North Korean special forces with imitation South Korean-style military digital camo uniform and K2 rifles (unlicensed locally made copies) were reported by ROK Army soldiers during the 2015 North Korean exchanges of artillery fire with South Korea across the Western Front.
- Papua New Guinea: Purchased K2C in 2013.
- Peru: Used by the Infantería de Marina del Perú (Peruvian Naval Infantry).
- Philippines: Purchased K2C1 in 2019, used by Philippine National Police based from a contract in 2018.
- Senegal: Purchased 100 in 2003.
- South Korea: A standard-issue rifle of the ROK Armed Forces since 1985. Used extensively by the South Korean contingent in Operation Enduring Freedom and the Iraq War. A small number of K2Cs were tested by the Republic of Korea Army Special Warfare Command in 2014, but it has not been adopted by ROK forces. Later, tens of thousands of K2C1s were mass-produced in 2015 as part of the rifle modernization plan and were introduced around front-line units from 2016.
- Thailand: 403 K2s transferred according to a 2019 SIPRI small arms report.

=== Non-state actors ===
- (Islamic State) Boko Haram: Seen in use with BH.
- ISIS: Captured from Iraqi troops. Also used by ISEA and various IS affiliated militants across Africa
- Niger Delta Avengers
- Syrian opposition: Seen in the hands of Syrian rebels

== See also ==
- M16 rifle: used prior to and replaced by K2, and was license produced by the Arsenal of National Defense (now S&T Motiv).
- AK-47: influenced in designing gas piston system.
- Daewoo Precision Industries K1: shared same development program.
- S&T Daewoo XK8: proposed replacement, rejected after field test.
- S&T Daewoo K11: proposed replacement, rejected after field test.
- Dasan Machineries K16: possible replacement of K2 in the Republic of Korea Armed Forces.
