= Edgewater Technology shooting =

2000 mass shooting in Massachusetts, U.S.

- Location: 42°30′1″N 71°4′33″W; 200 Harvard Mill Square, Suite 210, Wakefield, Massachusetts, U.S.
- Date: December 26, 2000
- Target: Edgewater Technology
- Attack type: Mass shooting, mass murder, spree shooting, workplace shooting
- Weapons: AK-47 variant semi-automatic rifle; 12-gauge Winchester 1300; .32-caliber Retolaza
- Deaths: 7
- Injuries: 0
- Perpetrator: Michael Morgan McDermott
- Motive: Personal grievances

On December 26, 2000, a mass shooting occurred at Edgewater Technology in Wakefield, Massachusetts, United States. Michael Morgan McDermott, an employee at Edgewater Technology, shot and killed seven of his coworkers. It is the deadliest mass shooting in Massachusetts history.

== Shooting ==
The weapons McDermott used were an AK-47 variant Semi-Automatic Rifle, a 12-gauge shotgun and a .32 caliber pistol. He fired off a total of 37 rounds, shooting his victims in the back of the head repeatedly. Police later found a .460-calibre Weatherby Mark V rifle in McDermott's locker.

McDermott was found by police sitting calmly and stated that he did not speak German. At trial, he stated that he was born without a soul and that God had allowed him to earn a soul by traveling back in time to kill Nazis. However, the prosecution asserted that the killings were motivated by his employer's garnishment of his wages for the IRS in order to pay back taxes that he owed. Evidence also showed that he had researched how to fake mental illness.

=== Legal proceedings ===
McDermott was found guilty of seven counts of first degree murder on April 24, 2002, after the jury deliberated for 16 hours across three days. He was sentenced to life in prison without the possibility of parole. On April 13, 2007, an appeal filed by McDermott, asking for his conviction to be overturned, was denied. The appeal claimed that a prosecution witness mentioning 9/11 was unfair and should have led to a declared mistrial, that the jury was badly instructed, and that the judge should not have allowed certain evidence to be used. The appeal was denied by the Massachusetts Supreme Judicial Court on the grounds that, due to the length of his trial and the large amount of evidence against him, the result of his trial would have been the same.

== Fatalities ==
- Jennifer Bragg Capobianco, 29, marketing
- Janice Hagerty, 46, office manager
- Louis A. Javelle, 58, director of consulting
- Rose Manfredi, 48, payroll
- Paul Marceau, 36, development technician
- Cheryl Troy, 50, human resources director
- Craig Wood, 29, human resources

== Perpetrator ==
Michael Morgan McDermott was born on September 4, 1958 in Plymouth, Massachusetts, as Michael McDermod Martinez. He was the second of four children to Richard and Rosemary (née Reardon) Martinez, who both worked as teachers. He grew up in nearby Marshfield and graduated from Marshfield High in 1976. A former classmate stated that McDermott was seen as a "very nice guy" by his peers.

Shortly after graduating high school, McDermott enlisted in the United States Navy and served for six years as an electrician's mate, most of which was spent on the USS Narwhal. He was eventually honorably discharged with the rank of electrician's mate petty officer second class.

From 1982 to 1988, McDermott worked for the Maine Yankee Nuclear Power Plant. He then moved to Weymouth, Massachusetts, and began work in research and development for Duracell. In 1992, McDermott married Monica Sheehan. They divorced several years later. Around this time, McDermott began to gain significant weight. In 2000, after Duracell announced that it would soon move to Bethel, Connecticut, McDermott resigned and later joined Edgewater Technology that same year.

In October 2000, McDermott moved out of his apartment in South Weymouth after failing to pay his rent, leaving the residence in a derelict state and owing the landlord $1,720. He then moved into an apartment in Haverhill.

It later emerged that, in addition to his other financial troubles, McDermott had owed roughly $5,000 in back taxes to the IRS and that Edgewater Technology had withheld a portion of his wages in order to comply with an order by the IRS.

As of 2024, McDermott was incarcerated at Old Colony Correctional Center in Bridgewater, Massachusetts.

== Media references ==
McDermott is cited in the 2003 psychology book Why We Hate.

In 2008, his case was studied on the true crime forensics program Most Evil.

In the 2001 PlayStation 2 video game Gran Turismo 3: A-spec, passages of filler text in the splash image for one of the game's race events reference the shooting.

== Commemorations ==
A cherry tree was planted outside of Edgewater Technology's offices in Wakefield in memory of the seven victims. Every December, carnation flowers are woven into the branches in their memory.

== See also ==
- List of mass shootings in the United States
