= Sida shooting =

Mass murder in Abkhazia

- Location: Sida, Abkhazia
- Date: June 1, 1997; 5:00 a.m. (MSD)
- Target: Soldiers at military post
- Attack type: Mass murder, mass shooting, murder–suicide
- Weapon: AK-47
- Deaths: 11 (including the perpetrator)
- Injuries: 7 (3 seriously)
- Perpetrator: Artur Vaganov

The Sida shooting was a mass murder that occurred at an observation post of the Russian peacekeeping forces near the village Sida in Gali district, Abkhazia on June 1, 1997, when 22-year-old Sergeant Artur Vaganov killed ten of his comrades and wounded three others, before committing suicide.

== Shooting ==
At 5 a.m. on June 1, after performing his official duties, Sergeant Vaganov entered the barracks of observation post 203 of the northern security zone near the villages of Sida and Nabakevi, about 15 km south of Gali and, after cutting the post's communications and either storing away or disabling all other weapons, opened fire with an AK-47 rifle on his comrades who were sleeping in their beds. He next proceeded to the second floor where he killed the company commander, Sergei Gavrilov, and wounded Alexei Smotrin, the chief of the observation post. Vaganov eventually committed suicide by shooting himself in the head, when a sentry, alerted by the gunshots, rushed into the room. By then he had killed 10 of the 19 soldiers stationed at the post and seriously wounded three others.

The motive behind the shooting was not immediately known, but it was suspected that it may have been a reaction to hazing.

=== Victims ===
- First Lieutenant Sergei Gavrilov (Сергей Гаврилов)
- Junior Sergeant Alexander Medvedev (Александр Медведев)
- Junior Sergeant Dmitry Stepanov (Дмитрий Степанов)
- Junior Sergeant Alexey Yurchkov (Алексей Юрчков)
- Private Alexander Lukyanenko (Александр Лукьяненко)
- Private Oleg Mednikov (Олег Медников)
- Private Askar Nauruzbaev (Аскар Наурузбаев)
- Private Andrei Semenikhin (Андрей Семенихин)
- Private Sergei Shcherbakov (Сергей Щербаков)
- Private Regel Subeev (Регель Субеев)

Those wounded were Private Konstantin Snegirev (Константин Снегирев), Private Oleg Gulko (Олег Гулько) and Sergeant Alexei Smotrin (Алексей Смотрин).

== Background ==
=== Peacekeeping forces ===
On May 14, 1994, after the Abkhaz-Georgian war, an agreement was signed by the belligerents to deploy CIS peacekeeping forces at the Abkhaz-Georgian border with the task to oversee the ceasefire. The first Russian forces arrived in Abkhazia on June 23 the same year and numbered about 1,600 people at the time of the shooting.

=== Perpetrator ===
Artur Vaganov (Russian: Артур Ваганов) was an ethnic Russian from Bashkiria. He did two years of compulsory service in a reconnaissance battalion of the Totskoye Division, rising to the rank of staff sergeant and becoming second-in-command of a platoon. After a year back in civilian life he voluntarily enlisted to join the peacekeeping forces in the zone of the Georgian-Abkhaz conflict. The Volga Military District's 27th Peacekeeping Division, the platoon of which Vaganov was deputy leader, arrived in Abkhazia on April 15, 1997 and entered upon their peacekeeping duties at post 203 two days later.

Vaganov was generally given positive references regarding his service and was described by a UN military observer and a spokesman of the Russian peacekeeping forces as a very demanding and efficient soldier with high standards, who neither drank, nor smoked, though also as someone who was "psychologically not suited to the job."
