= M13 link =

Disintegrating metallic ammunition link

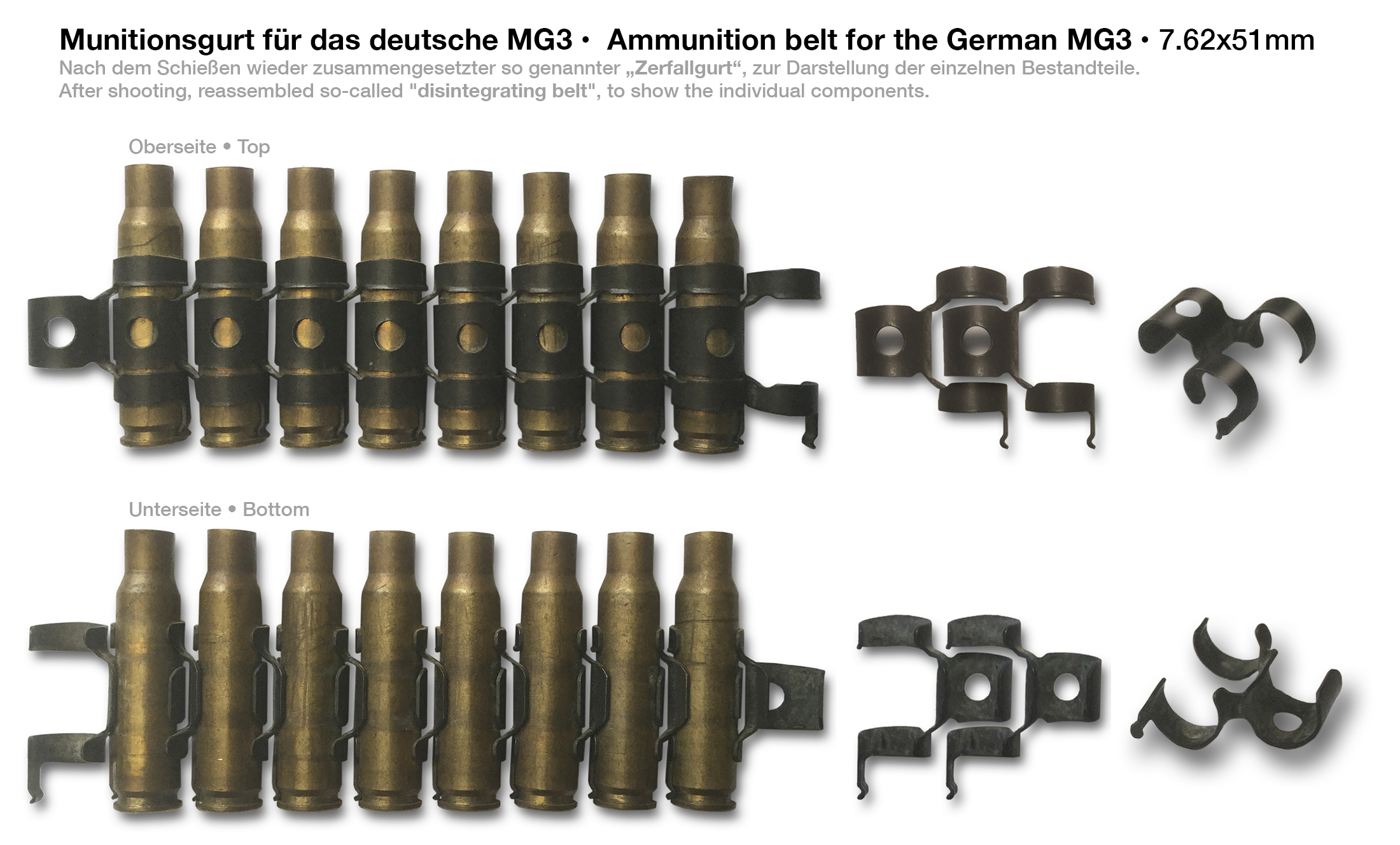
M13 links reassembled to previously fired 7.62×51mm NATO cartridge cases

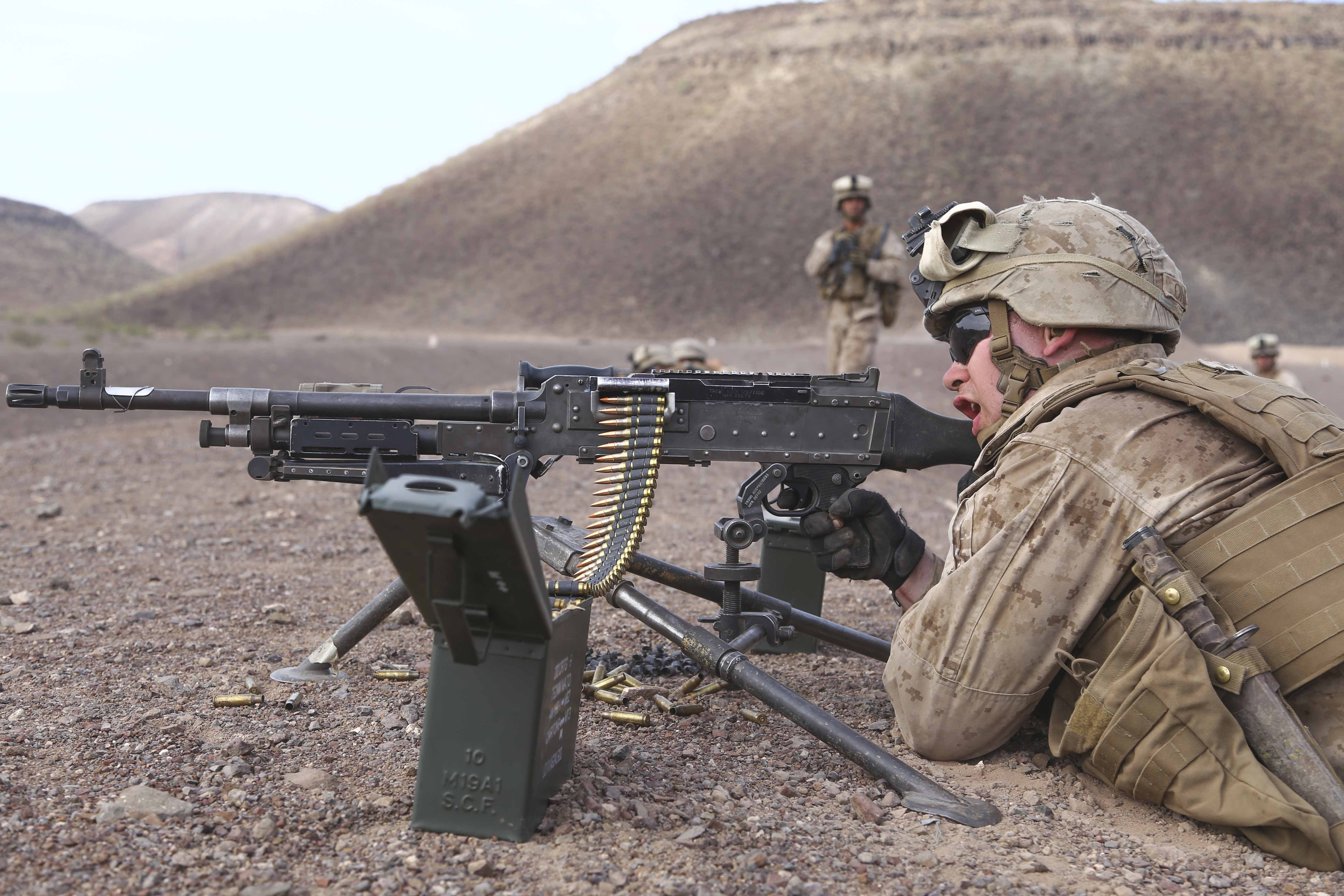
M13 links connect up to 200 7.62×51mm NATO rounds contained in an M19A1 ammunition box used to feed an M240G machine gun

The M13 link, formally Link, Cartridge, Metallic Belt, 7.62mm, M13, is the U.S. military designation for a metallic disintegrating link specifically designed for ammunition belt-fed firearms and 7.62×51mm NATO rounds. It was introduced in the mid-20th century. It is the primary link type for the United States and among NATO for the 7.62×51mm NATO cartridge. As of 2017, it has been in use for over 60 years and is used on the Dillon M134D Minigun, M60 Machine Gun, FN MAG/M240, Mk 48, MG3, HK21, MG5, UKM-2000, K16, SS-77, and Negev NG-7, among others. Some countries redesignated the M13 link when it was adopted.

== History ==
The M13 link replaced the older M1 links designed for .30-06 Springfield ammunition, which bound cartridges to each other at the neck, used on the older M1917 Browning machine gun and M1919 Browning machine gun family, though some conversions of the M1919 to the M13 were done, such as on the U.S. Navy Mark 21 Mod 0 machine gun, which saw service in the Vietnam War. Once converted, it cannot use other link types, as firearms made for the M13 Link are not backward-compatible with the M1 link (or other systems). The M9 link is technically very similar to the M1 link but designed for 12.7×99mm NATO/.50 BMG ammunition used in heavy machine guns like the M2 machine gun. The M1 and M9 links are pull-out designs. Rounds are extracted by pulling them rearward out of the link.

The NATO Standardization Agreement STANAG 2329 Links for Disintegrating Belts for Use with NATO 7.62mm Cartridges described the M13 link in 1982. STANAG 2329 has been rendered inactive. The DEF STAN 13-33 - Standard NATO 7.62 Millimetre Rounds and Associated Chargers and Links is a 1982 standard by the Ministry of Defence of the United Kingdom. This Defence Standard specifies 7.62 mm small arms ammunition and its associated chargers and links for use by the Ministry of Defence to meet its commitment to NATO in the United Kingdom. The United States Army MIL-DTL-45403E (3) CONT. DIST. - Link, Cartridge, Metallic Belt, 7.62 Millimeter - M13 2021 specification covers the requirements and verification methods for the Link, Cartridge, Metallic Belt, 7.62mm - M13 for use in 7.62mm machine guns.

== Design details ==
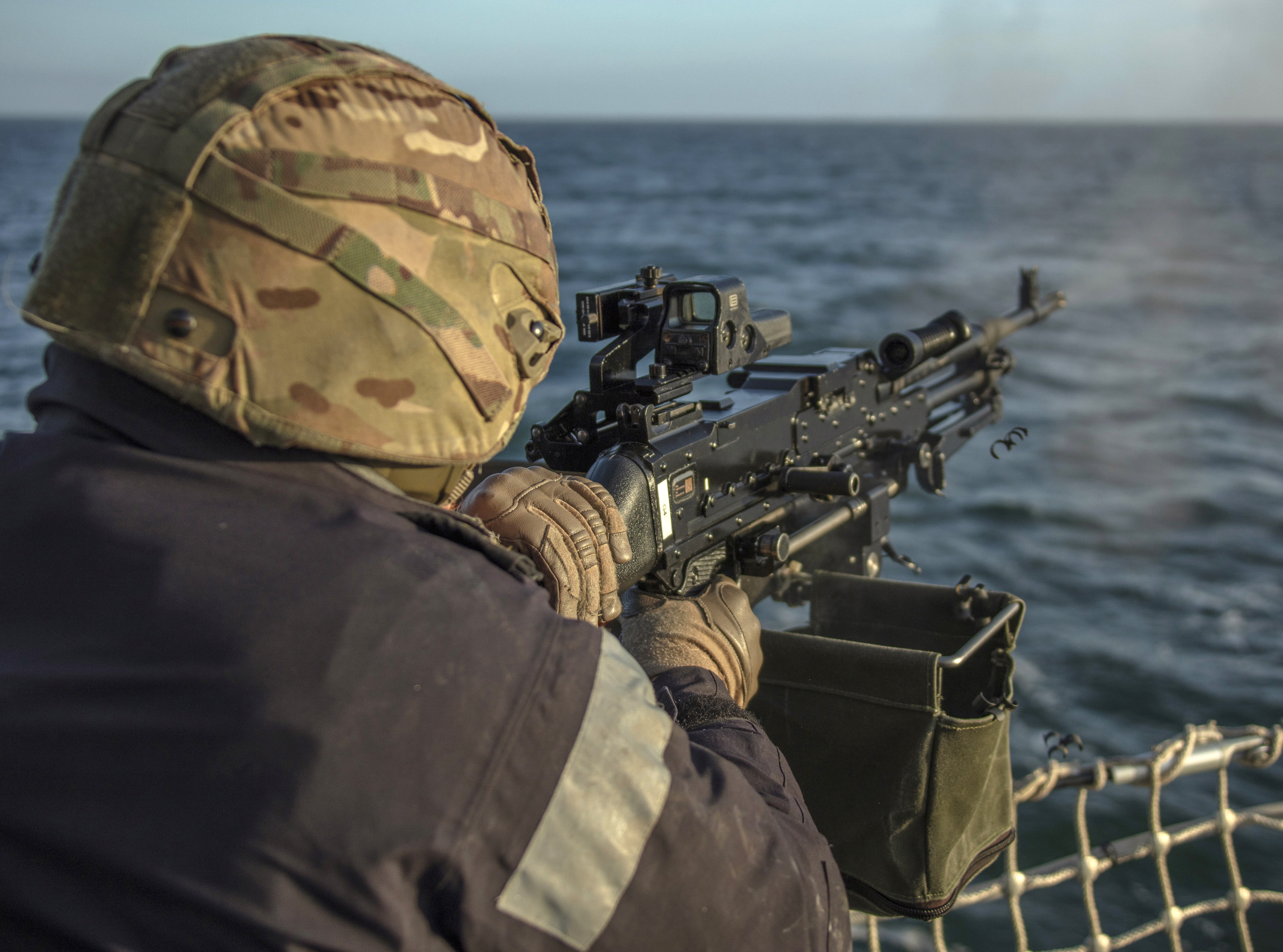
A gunner from the HMS Lancaster's ship's company takes part in small arms firing at sea (SAFAS) using a pintle-mounted GPMG with an EOTech holographic weapon sight and an ejected M13 link piece and cartridge case collection bag

The M13 link is a push-through design. Rounds are extracted by pushing them forward out of the link. The left side of a single link has a semi-circular loop which holds the main body of the cartridge case below the shoulder, and an extension on the right that forms two similar loops which were designed to fit in between the two right-side loops of the next link, and which have a small metal tab that extends down to the cartridge base and fit into the extraction groove of the case. The M13 link binds the rounds from halfway down the length of the case to the case head. This was designed so that the bolt of the machine gun using the link would come forward upon squeezing the trigger and strip a round from its link from below the cartridge, and the round would be chambered, fired, then extracted and ejected. The feeding pawl in the gun would pull the belt to the right as the gun was fired or cocked, sending the loose link out to the right side of the receiver, where the expended case was also ejected, normally separately from a separate ejector port from the link. MIL-L-45403D stipulates that the force to strip a NATO approved round from the M13 link should be between 8.5 and 18 lb_{f} (37.8 and 80.1 N) and the belt should have a minimal tensile strength of 55 lb_{f} (244.7 N). A single M13 link masses approximately 4.35 g (67.1 gr) and accordingly weighs approximately 0.153 oz_{f} (42.659 mN).

The links often have an extra anti-corrosion surface treatment, generally (oil impregnated) black phosphate, and can be collected and reassembled by hand with fresh ammunition, but in practice this is not commonly done as it is labor intensive and the inexpensive links are considered disposable. Sometimes the ejected link pieces are collected to avoid littering the interior of vehicles, such as aircraft or ships.

The early 1970s M27 link is a link of smaller but identical design, used among NATO for 5.56×45mm NATO chambered light machine guns such as the FN Minimi/M249, HK21, MG4, CETME Ameli, K3, Mini-SS and Negev, among others.

== See also ==
- M1 link
- M27 link
- List of firearms
