= Denel DMG-5 =

- Type: General Purpose Machine Gun
- Place of origin: South Africa

Production history
- Designed: 2016
- Manufacturer: Denel Land Systems
- Variants: Variants

Specifications
- Mass: 8.4 kg (18 lb 8 oz) (DMG-5)
- Length: 1,055 mm (41.5 in) (short stock); 1,135 mm (44.7 in) (long stock)
- Barrel length: 550 mm (21.7 in) (DMG-5); 500 mm (19.7 in) (DMG-5 CX)
- Cartridge: 7.62×51mm NATO
- Action: Gas-operated, open bolt
- Rate of fire: 700–900 rounds/min
- Muzzle velocity: 830 m/s (2,723 ft/s)
- Effective firing range: 1,500 m (1,640 yd)
- Maximum firing range: 3,000 m (3,281 yd)
- Feed system: belt

The Denel DMG-5 is a general-purpose machine gun designed and manufactured by Denel Land Systems of South Africa.

== Design ==
Denel Land Systems unveiled the lightest 7.62×51mm NATO general- purpose machine gun (GPMG) at the Africa Aerospace and Defence 2016. The new weapon, designated the Denel DMG-5, currently weighs 8.4 kg, 20% lighter compared to the company’s current production GPMG, the Denel SS-77, weighing 10.3 kg. This development challenge was given to three young engineers to refine the uniquely South African designed Denel SS-77 that was developed in 1977 by Richard Joseph Smith and Lazlo Soregi. The three young mechanical engineering graduates, Dakalo Nekhumbe, Phindile Mashaba and Marumo Talane, are all products of the Denel Engineering Academy.

The DMG-5 has an effective range of 1,500 m. It has a firing rate of 700 rounds per minute to 900 rounds per minute. It is gas-operated, with a side locking system. As with all GPMGs, it is fed with continuous belts of ammunition. Nominal muzzle velocity is 830 m/sec. It can fire up to 400 rounds before the barrel needs to be cooled or replaced. With a long collapsible stock, it is 1.135 m long and, with a short collapsible stock, it is 1.055 m long.

The DMG-5 is chambered for 7.62×51mm NATO but could be made in 5.56×45mm NATO. It is slightly shorter than the SS-77.

The DMG-5 differs from the SS-77 in most areas, except the operating system. The barrel is fluted to lighten it. The Feed Cover is equipped with a top mounted full length Picatinny rail to accommodate different optical day or night sights. Backup iron sights can be provided. The front grip is equipped with three Picatinny rails to attach accessories like flashlights, laser pointers, etcetera. A removable front pistol grip can be fitted on the front Picatinny rail and can be adjusted to suit the operator’s personal requirements. A retractable bipod can be mounted on the same Picatinny rail.

=== DMG-5 CX ===
The DMG-5 CX is a longer heavy-barrelled version with spade grips for use in remotely controlled weapon stations, as a coaxial weapon on armoured vehicles, or flexible mounts on vehicles.

== Variants ==
- DMG-5 standard infantry model
- DMG-5 CX heavy barrel and adaptations for vehicle mounts and remote weapon stations
