= M27 link =

NATO link for rounds in belt-fed firearms

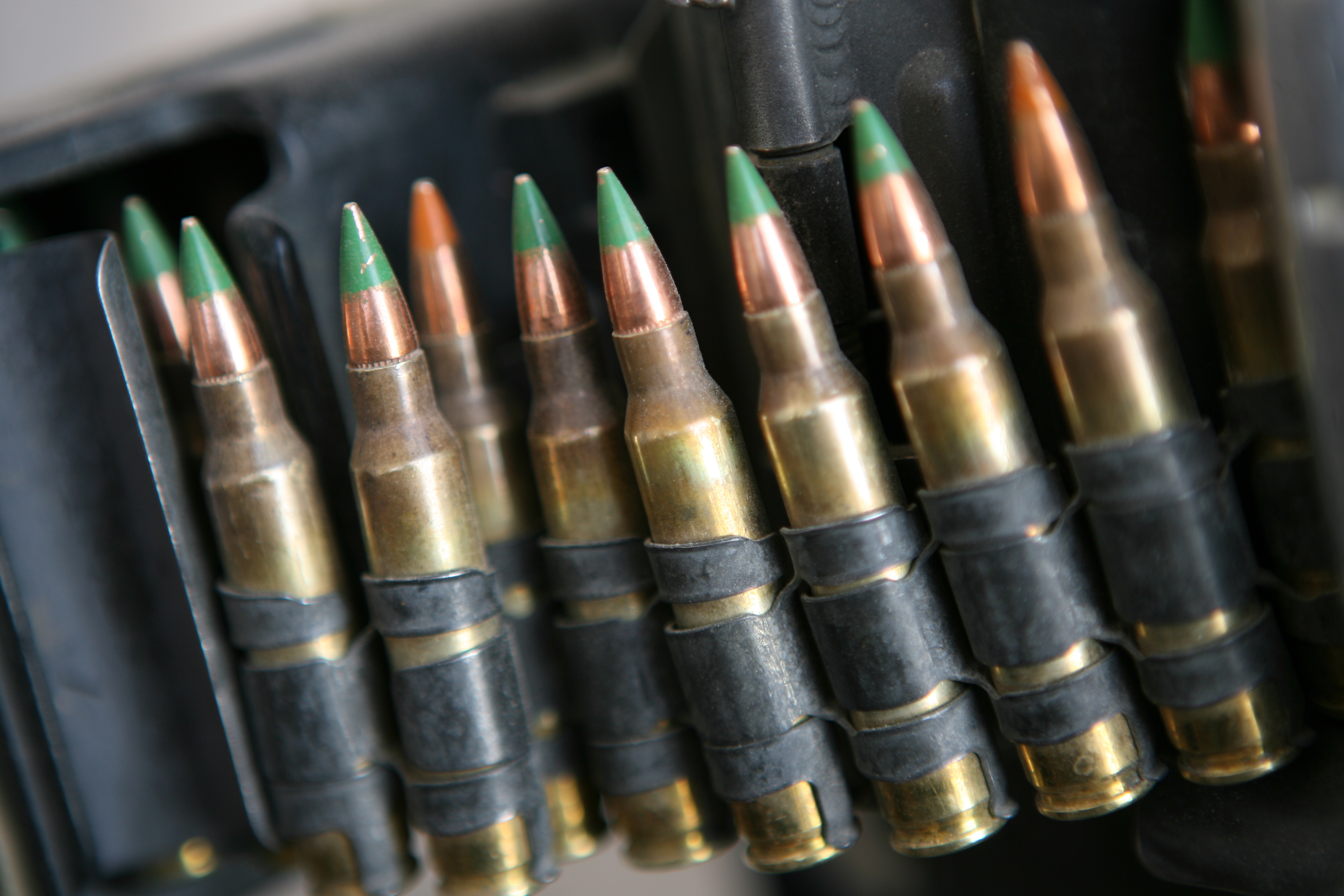
5.56×45mm NATO ammunition linked by M27 links

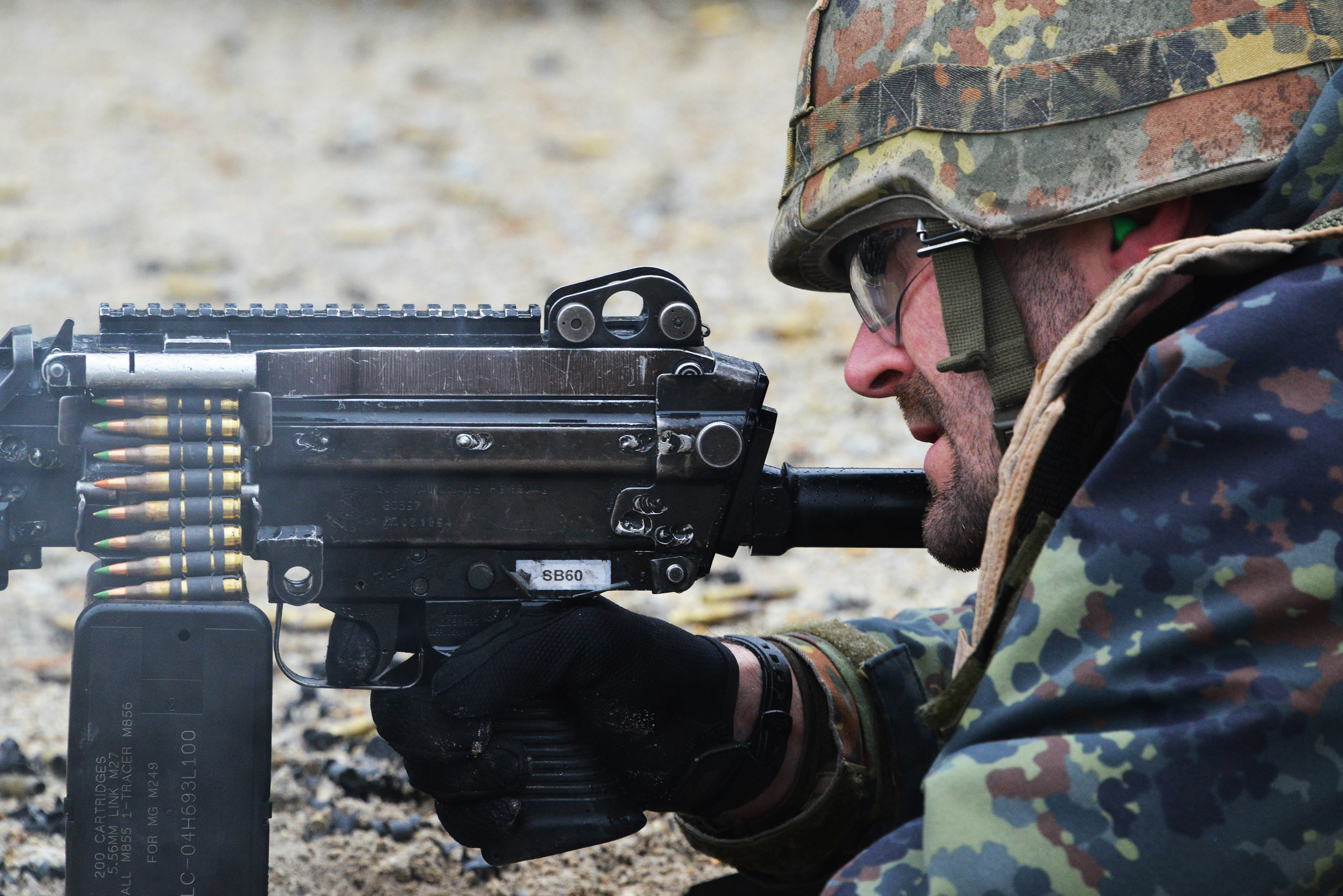
M27 links connect up to 200 5.56×45m NATO rounds contained in an ammunition box used to feed a M249 light machine gun

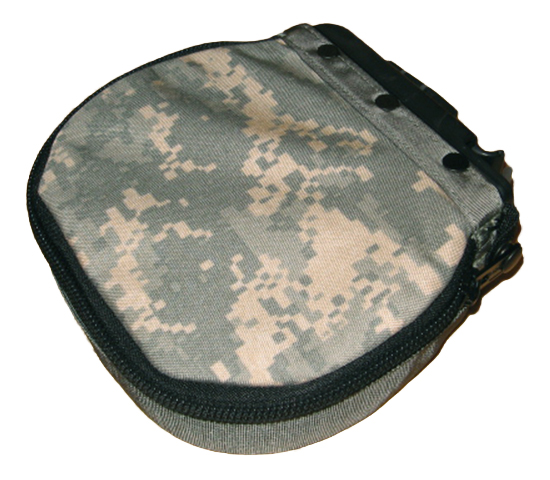
A cloth pouch capable of holding 200 M27 rounds

The M27 link, formally Link, Cartridge, Metallic Belt, 5.56mm, M27 is a metallic disintegrating link issued by the United States armed forces and among NATO and designed for use in belt-fed firearms. It holds 5.56×45mm NATO ammunition.

== History ==
The first scaled-down version of the mid-20th century M13 link was developed in the early 1960s for the Stoner 63 belt-fed light machine gun/squad automatic weapon and designated as the "S-63 BRW" link. In the early 1970s this scaling-down concept was further developed. The resulting modified link had a slightly different angle of pitch and was adapted as the M27 link for use with the FN Minimi/M249 SAW. The M27 link is used on the FN Minimi/M249, HK23, MG4, CETME Ameli, K3, Mini-SS and Negev, among others.

== Design details ==
Each M27 link consists of a single piece of metal curved into two partial cylinders, into which adjacent rounds slide. Like the M13 link, the M27 link is a push-through design. Rounds are extracted by pushing forward out of the link. With the round freed, the link disintegrates (detaches from the belt) and is ejected. This is in contrast with older belt systems which were typically made of fabric and were fed straight through the weapon without disintegrating. MIL-L-63532C stipulates that the force to strip a NATO approved round from the M27 link should be between 5.5 and 16 lb_{f} (24.5 and 71.2 N) and the belt should have a minimal tensile strength of 33 lb_{f} (146.8 N). A single M27 link weighs approximately 2 g (30.9 gr).

The links often have an extra anti-corrosion surface treatment, generally (oil impregnated) black phosphate, and can be collected and reassembled by hand with fresh ammunition, but in practice this is not commonly done as it is labor-intensive, and the inexpensive links are considered disposable.

== See also ==
- M1 link
- M13 link
