= M1 link =

United States military designation

The M1 link was the U.S. military designation for a steel disintegrating link designed for the M1917 Browning machine gun and M1919 Browning machine gun, and the .30-06 Springfield cartridge that they fired. A single round would hold two links together, and more could be added to make up a belt of any quantity of rounds, though for the mounted machine guns of the time, a belt of 250 rounds was most commonly used. As was the trend with American belt-fed firearms, as opposed to Soviet designs, belts of ammunition feed into the gun from the left side to the right.

The left side of a single link had a circular loop which would hold the main body of the cartridge case, and an extension on the right that formed two similar loops which was designed to fit in between the two right-side loops of the next link. The rear loop of the right side of the link would hold onto the cartridge case just below the shoulder, as would the left side loop, where the front loop of the left side of the link held onto the cartridge neck, and was therefore a bit smaller in diameter. This was designed so that the M1919 machine gun's extractor claw would take hold of the rim of the cartridge and pull it out of the linked belt from the rear, where it would then be fed into the chamber and would rest there until fired. The feeding pawl in the gun would pull the belt to the right as the gun was fired or cocked, sending the loose link out to the right side of the receiver, where the expended case was dropped vertically below the gun. This disintegrating system is a contrast to older canvas belts and other non-disintegrating metal link belts. Disintegrating-link types are almost universal in the present day, as the lower cost and the lack of a loose empty belt end to deal with are very attractive to the military.

M1 links were used during World War I, World War II, and the Korean War but were replaced in frontline service by the NATO M13 link developed for the M60 machine gun.

== See also ==
- M13 link
- M27 link
