= Vektor SS-77 =

SS-77
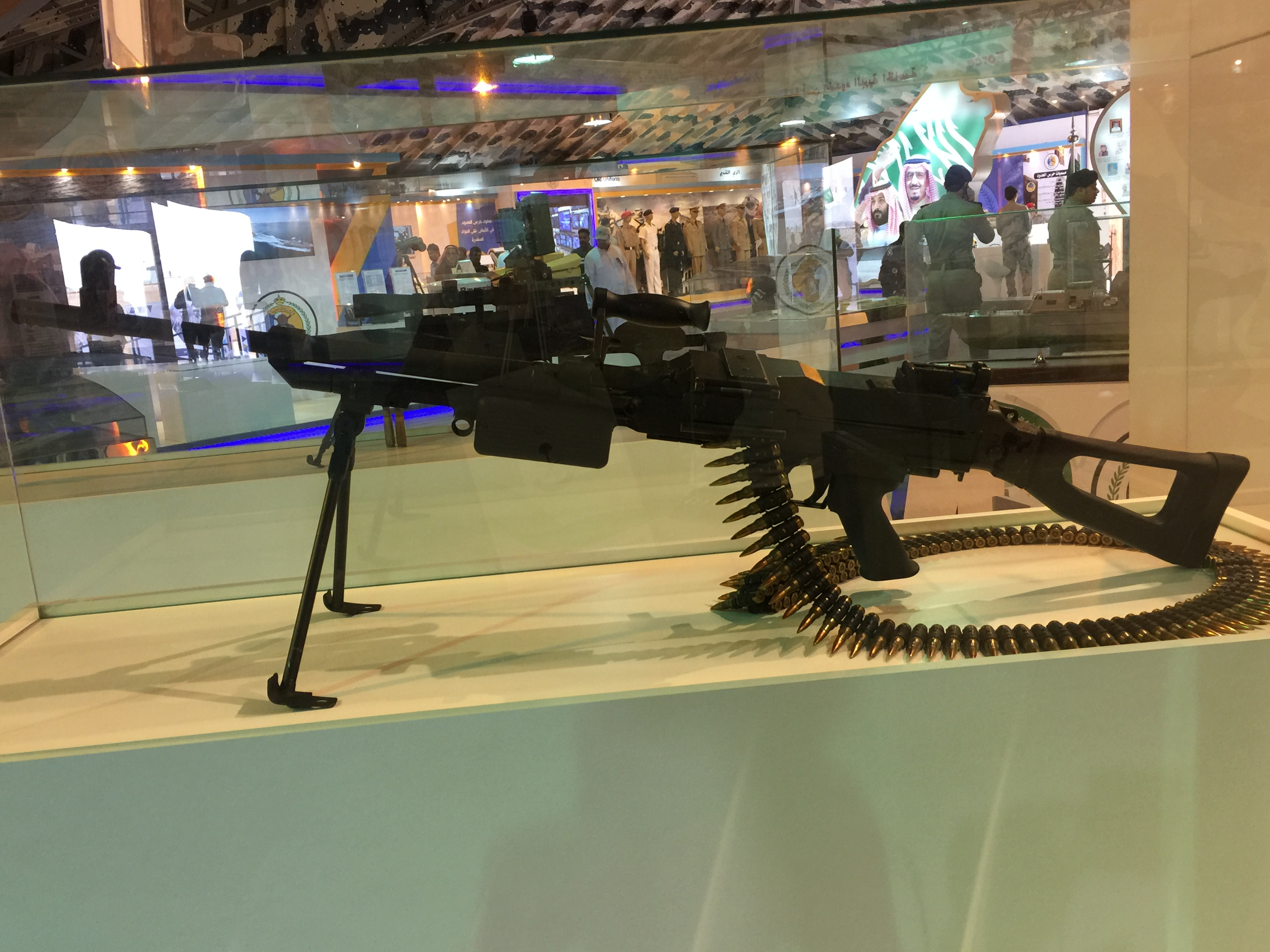
- Type: General purpose machine gun
- Place of origin: South Africa

Service history
- In service: 1986–present
- Used by: See Users
- Wars: South African Border War; Rwandan Civil War; Kivu conflict

Production history
- Designed: 1977
- Manufacturer: Denel Land Systems
- Variants: Variants

Specifications
- Mass: 9.6 kg (21 lb 3 oz) (SS-77); 8.26 kg (18 lb 3 oz) (Mini SS)
- Length: 1155 mm (SS-77); 1000 mm (Mini-SS)
- Barrel length: 550 mm (SS-77); 500 mm (Mini-SS)
- Cartridge: 7.62×51mm NATO (SS-77); 5.56×45mm NATO (Mini-SS)
- Action: Gas-operated, open bolt
- Rate of fire: 600–900 rounds/min
- Feed system: Disintegrating R1M1 link belt alternatively disintegrating M13 belt or non-disintegrating DM1 belt (SS-77); Disintegrating M27 belt (Mini-SS)

The Vektor SS-77 is a general-purpose machine gun designed and manufactured by Denel Land Systems—formerly Lyttleton Engineering Works (LIW)—of South Africa.

== History ==
In the late 1970s, South Africa was involved in an international controversy over apartheid and the South African Border War in Angola. As a result, it was subject to an international arms embargo and had to, out of necessity, design and manufacture its own weapons. The SS-77 was developed to replace the FN MAG. It was designed in 1977 by Col. Richard Joseph "Boer" Smith and Lazlo Soregi. The "SS" in its name stands for Smith and Soregi, and "77" for 1977, the year it was designed. The design was put into action and the prototype components were hand manufactured in the armoury shop of 61 BWS under the supervision of Sgt Hattingh, L/cpl Nel and two privates. When said components worked well in the prototype, it was handed over to Lyttleton Engineering, who eventually manufactured and brought the SS77 into production.

Denel unveiled at the Africa Aerospace and Defence (AAD) 2016 exhibit that the SS-77 will be replaced in production by the DMG-5 and DMG-5 CX GPMG.

SS-77s typically feed ammunition using an R1M1 disintegrating link belt, though M13 disintegrating link belts and non-disintegrating DM1 belts are also compatible. The belt may also be further contained in a dust-proof nylon pouch with a 100-round capacity, or a waterproof and rigid box with a 200-round capacity.

=== Mini-SS ===
In 1994, a light machine gun version, the Mini-SS, chambered in 5.56×45mm NATO was introduced. LIW also manufactured kits to convert existing SS-77 to the Mini-SS. Changes include the weight decrease from 9.6 to 8.26 kg (21 lb 3 oz to 18 lb 3 oz) with a folding bipod and fixed butt.

== Variants ==
- SS-77 is the 7.62×51mm NATO calibre
- Mini-SS is chambered for 5.56×45mm NATO.
- Mini-SS Compact
- DMG-5

== Users ==
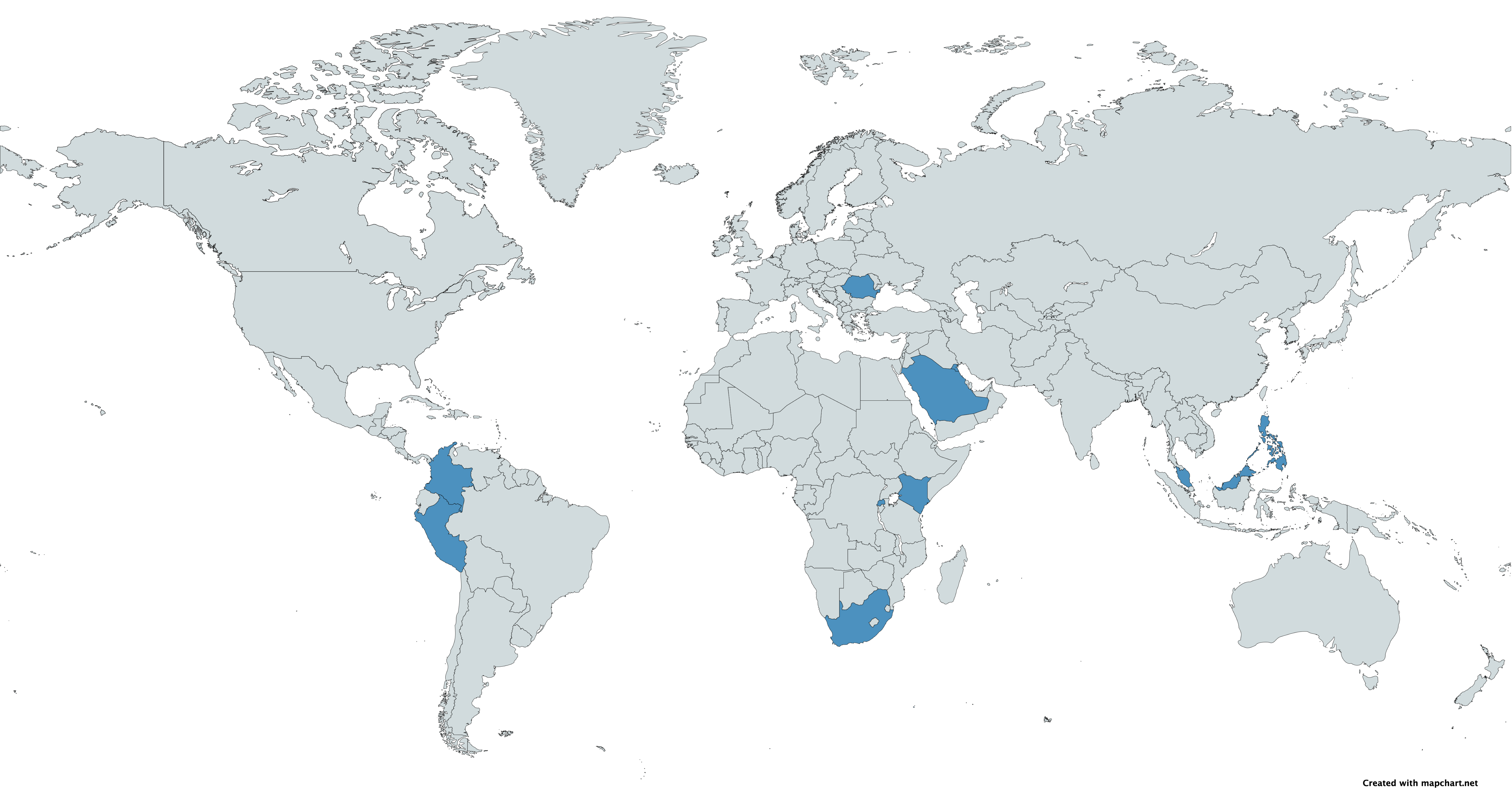
Map with SS-77 users in blue

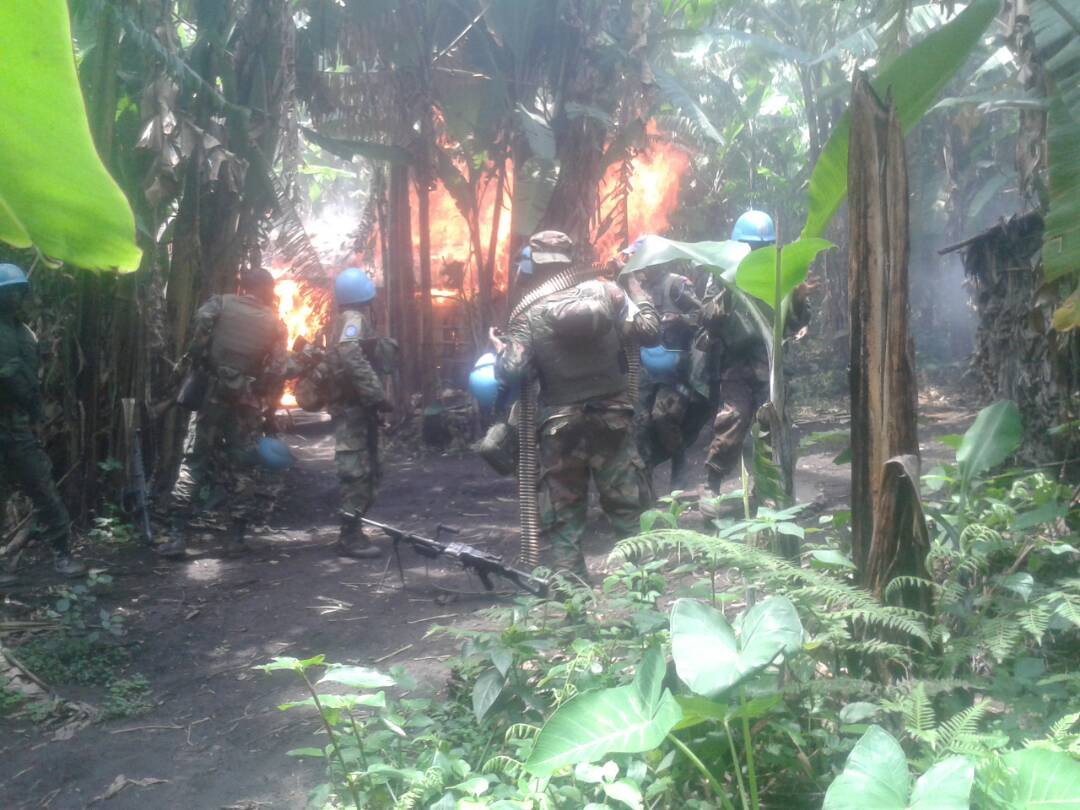
- South African soldiers serving in the United Nations Force Intervention Brigade with a SS-77 during operations against the Democratic Forces for the Liberation of Rwanda, North Kivu, 2017.
  Colombia: Policía Nacional de Colombia, Infantería de Marina de Colombia.
- Democratic Forces for the Liberation of Rwanda
- Indonesia: Indonesian National Armed Forces
- Kenya: Kenya Air Force: For IAR 330 helicopters.
- Kuwait
- Malaysia: Royal Malaysian Navy-PASKAL and Malaysian Maritime Enforcement Agency
- Peru: Mini-SS for the Peruvian Army
- Philippines: Philippine National Police-Special Action Force
- Romania: 215 SS-77 MK1 LMGs acquired in late 2008 and delivered in 2009.
- Rwanda: SS-77 machine guns were delivered in 1992. Some were captured by the Rwandan Patriotic Front.
- Saudi Arabia: Mini-SS
- South Africa: General-purpose machine gun of the South African National Defence Force. Issued since 1986.

== Popular culture ==
=== Video games ===
- Arma 3, in DLC Western Sahara (« SA-77 »)
