= IWI Negev =

Israeli light machine gun

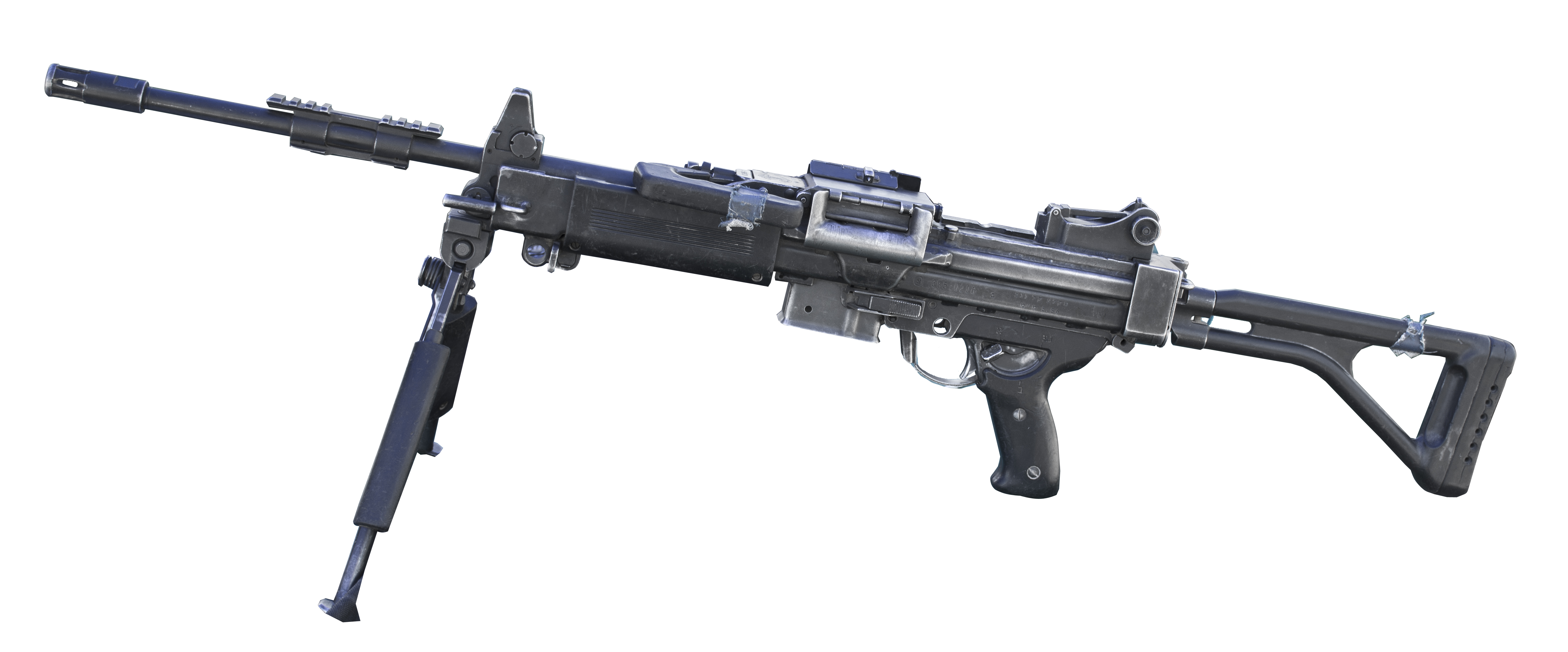
- Negev chambered in 5.56×45mm NATO
- Type: Light machine gun
- Place of origin: Israel

Service history
- In service: 1997–present
- Used by: See Users
- Wars: Second Intifada; 2006 Lebanon War; Gaza War (2008–2009); War in Afghanistan (2001–2021); Operation Protective Edge; Russo-Ukrainian War; Gaza war 2025 Cambodia–Thailand conflict

Production history
- Designer: Israel Military Industries
- Designed: 1985–1990
- Manufacturer: Israel Weapon Industries made under license by PLR Systems, India Z111 Factory (licensed components and derived copies)
- Produced: 1995–present
- Variants: See Variants

Specifications
- Mass: 7.65 kg (16.9 lb) (Negev NG-5); 7.6 kg (17 lb) (Negev NG-7) 7.4 kg (16 lb) (STrL-7,62VN)
- Length: 1,020 mm (40 in) (stock extended) (Negev and Negev NG-5); 1,100 mm (43 in) (stock extended) (Negev NG-7)
- Barrel length: 460 mm (18 in) (Negev NG-5); 508 mm (20.0 in) (Negev NG-7)
- Cartridge: 5.56×45mm NATO (Negev and Negev NG-5); 7.62×51mm NATO (Negev NG-7) 7.62×39mm (STrL-7,62VN)
- Action: Gas-operated, rotating bolt
- Rate of fire: 850–1050 RPM (Negev and Negev NG-5) 600–750 RPM (Negev NG-7)
- Muzzle velocity: 915 m/s (3,000 ft/s) (Negev and Negev NG-5); 860 m/s (2,800 ft/s) (Negev NG-7) 735 m/s (2,410 ft/s) (STrL-7,62VN)
- Effective firing range: 300–1,000 m sight adjustments
- Maximum firing range: 1,200 m (1,300 yd)
- Feed system: 150-, 200-round disintegrating M27 ammunition belt, 35-round box magazine or STANAG NATO magazines (Negev and Negev NG-5); 100- and 125-round disintegrating M13 NATO ammunition belts (Negev NG-7) M43-cartridge box magazine, drum magazine or RPD's 100-round non-disintegrating ammuntion belt (STrL-7,62VN)
- Sights: Aperture with elevation drum, adjustable front post, folding tritium night sights, and a Picatinny rail for various optical sights.

The IWI Negev (also known as the Negev NG-5) is a 5.56×45mm NATO light machine gun developed by Israel Weapon Industries (IWI), formerly Israel Military Industries Ltd. (IMI).

In 2012, IWI introduced the Negev NG-7, a variant chambered in 7.62×51mm NATO. The NG stands for Next Generation. Both variants of the Negev are in service with the Israel Defense Forces.

== Development ==
The Negev started development in 1985 by Israel Military Industries (now Israel Weapon Industries) to replace the then in service Galil ARM. The Negev entered service with the IDF in 1997, after extensive testing conducted by the IDF Ordnance Corps. The Negev is named after the Negev Desert in southern Israel.

== Design details ==
The Negev is a gas-operated, air-cooled, open bolt, select-fire, light machine gun (LMG) with a rotating bolt. The Negev uses a long-stroke gas piston system that runs under the barrel and is connected directly to the bolt carrier, the gas system comes with a three position gas regulator for use with different feed types and conditions. The design was made to be reliable, especially in adverse conditions. It was officially adopted by the Israeli Defense Forces (IDF) in 1997.

=== Barrel ===
The Negev has a quick-change chrome-lined cold hammer forged barrel. The barrel is fitted with a slotted flash suppressor and a folding ambidextrous carry handle, which is used to carry the weapon and remove the barrel of the Negev.

During the weapon's initial development a barrel with a 1 in (25 mm) (1:12 in) rifling twist rate was also planned, adapted for the lightweight M193 cartridge. Additionally, a multifunction muzzle device was designed, used to launch rifle grenades.

=== Sights and hardware ===
==== Sights ====
The Negev's iron sights (closed-type) consist of a front post (adjustable for both windage and elevation) and a rear aperture sight with an elevation adjustment drum, with 300 to 1,000 m range settings in 100 m increments. The sight line radius is 440 millimeters (17.3 in). The Negev is equipped with tritium sights for night-time operations, the vials are embedded into the front and rear sights, with a night sight exposed on the rear aperture.

The Negev has its sight rail mounted to the frame of the gun, and not the feed top cover, which is detached when reloading. This allows it to stay zeroed for a longer period of time when mounting red-dot, reflex sights or other optics.

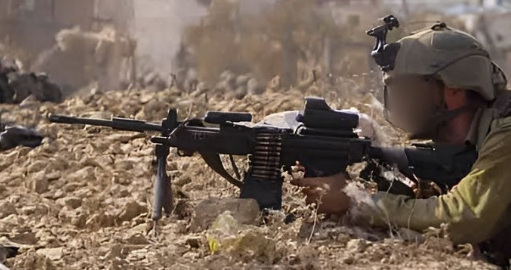
Negev NG-7 with a MEPRO MOR sight/laser combo

The classic Negev did not possess the modern standardized Picatinny rail, and instead came with a welded adapter for an optical sight. The newer NG-5 and NG-7 have a standard picatinny rail, and in Israel are usually fitted with an optical scope similar to the standard scopes of Israeli assault rifles.

In the Indian Army service, the force selected the MEPRO X6 telescopic sight, which has a fixed 6x magnification, from Meprolight as the dedicated daytime optic. Meprolight signed a technology transfer agreement with India's RRP Defense who will produce the system in India, supply them to Bharat Electronics, the primary contractor for the sights. This can enhance the effective firing range to 1,000 m.

==== Stock ====
The full size Negev and Negev SF was originally manufactured with a metal-tube, fixed-length, folding (right) stock. This classic tube skeleton stock was a modified stock from the Galil rifle. The design of the Negev's recoil springs and non-reciprocating handle, allow the Negev to fire with the skeleton stock folded; however during reload the bolt cannot be actuated with the stock folded.

The Negev NG-5 came fitted with an adjustable length folding stock, that folds to the opposite direction to allow complete operation of the gun with the stock folded, with cheek well adjustment, allowing for easier fitting.

==== Bipod ====
Every variant of the Negev can have a folding bipod, installed to the forward end of the handguard and folded under and becoming part of the handguard when stowed. The receiver also has slots and hooks used to secure the weapon to vehicle mounting hardware, including helicopters.

The Negev SF 'Commando' variants also come with a 45 degree forward grip "assault handle", allowing controlled fire while not using the bipod. The assault grip and bipod can be installed together, however the bipod cannot be folded with the assault grip installed.

The classic Negev could be fitted with mounting hardware on the handguard to allow users to mount a laser pointer. Current Negev models come mounting positions for bipods and the "assault grip" as well as a number of picatinny rails, including on the handguard allowing users to mount other hardware, including: laser pointers or laser target and illumination devices.

=== Ammunition ===
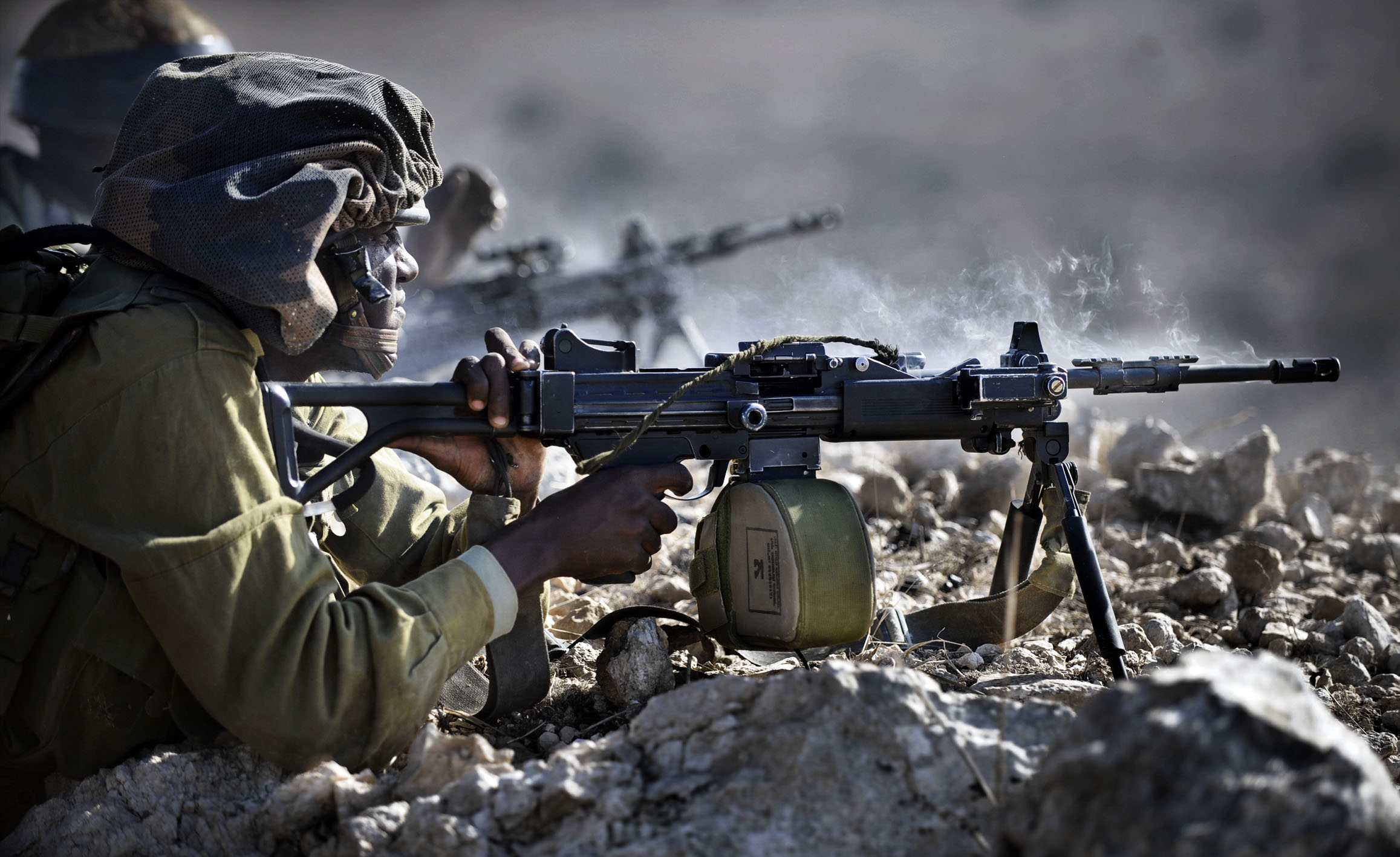
IDF infantryman firing a Negev during a training exercise

The standard Negev is chambered in 5.56×45mm NATO, optimized for the SS109 cartridge. The Negev NG-7 and 7 ULMG variants are chambered in 7.62×51mm NATO.

The Negev feeds from an M27 disintegrating, open-link ammunition belt, carried in a 150-round fabric container that clips into the magazine well, or alternatively from a 35-round box magazine from the Galil assault rifle, or a 30-round STANAG magazine from the M16 rifle (with the use of an adapter). 200-round ammunition belt containers are also available. Belted ammunition is introduced into the feed tray port from the left side, while the magazine is inserted vertically into the magazine well at the base of the receiver.

The feed system, which loosely copies the Czechoslovak Vz. 52 and the PK, uses a lever mounted on the left wall of the receiver and driven by a cam in the recoiling bolt carrier to turn a small feed pawl. The belt is pushed by the pawl only during the rearward movement of the bolt carrier.

The Negev 7 ULMG and ULMG SF, can be converted to 6.5mm Creedmoor cartridge by changing barrels; and feed from standard M13 disintegrating links.

In late 2024, Vietnam revealed a local Negev variant, designated as the STrL-7,62VN (Vietnamese: Súng Trung Liên - 7,62mm Việt Nam, lit. 'Medium Machine Gun - 7,62mm Viet Nam'), being the first product utilizing the Negev platform but chambered in 7.62×39mm. Likely becoming the country's next standard-issued light machine gun succeeding the obsoleted RPD machine guns, STrL-7,62VN is compatible to both AK/STV/RPK's magazines and RPD's 100-round non-disintegrating belt, using a soft belt box instead of RPD's heavy metal drum container.

== Variants ==
- Negev (1997–2012) – Released in 1997. It has a barrel length of 460 mm (18.11 inches) and can be fired either in semi or fully automatic. The pre-NG Negev came with a folding, fixed length skeleton stock, that is still available.
- Negev SF (1997–2012) – The Negev SF, or "Commando" version, is a compact variant of the Negev. It uses a shorter barrel and is primarily fitted with a side grip (NEGEV Assault Grip). It has a barrel length of 330 mm (12.99 inches).
- Negev (2012–present) – Previously named 'Negev NG-5' has been renamed the Negev. The Negev is available with the original Galil-like stock, or an updated adjustable folding stock.
- Negev SF (2012–present) – A compact variant of the Negev NG-5. It uses a shorter barrel and is primarily fitted with the Negev assault grip. It has a barrel length of 330 mm (13 in). The Negev NG-5 SF has been renamed to the Negev SF. The updated Negev SF has a folding adjustable stock, with adjustable cheek well.

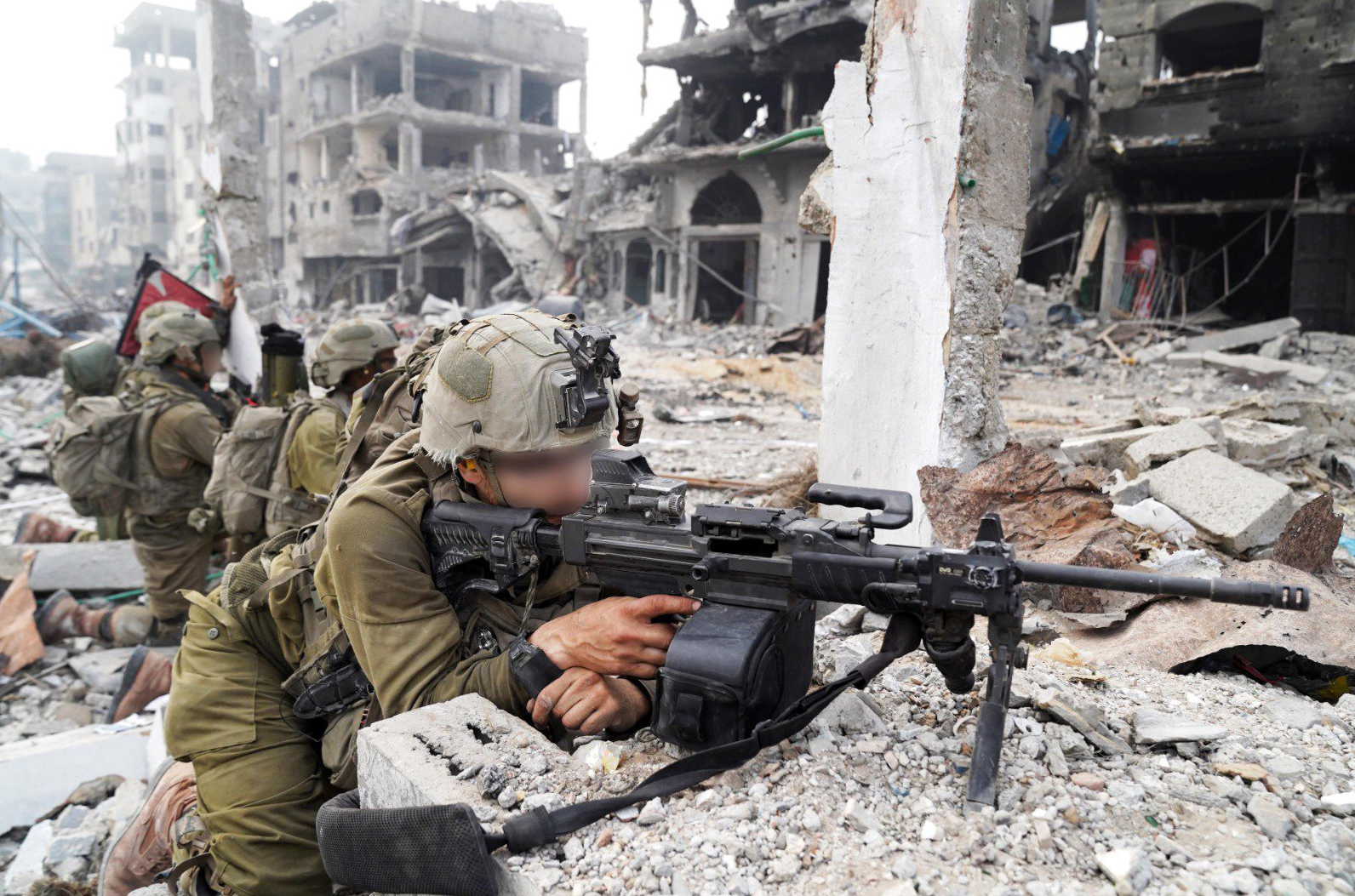
IDF commando with a Negev NG-7 during the Gaza war

- Negev NG-7 (2012–present) – Chambered for the 7.62×51mm NATO cartridge. It has a barrel length of 508 mm (20.0 inches) and is select-fire. It is fed by a 100- or 125-round assault drum magazine containing disintegrating M13 NATO standard ammunition belts or NATO standard ammunition belts and has two gas regulator settings as the possibility for box magazine feeding was omitted. The IWI eLog weapon-embedded sensor module was added to collect and store data on the actual use of the weapons for more efficient maintenance management and servicing by armourers.
- Negev NG-7 SF (2012–present) – A compact variant of the Negev NG-7. It uses a shorter barrel and is primarily fitted with a side grip (Negev assault grip). It has a barrel length of 420 mm (16.5 inches).
- Negev NG-7 SF 13 (2012–present) – Identical to the NG-7 SF but with a 330 mm (13.0 in) barrel.
- Negev 7 ULMG (2023–present) – Released in 2023, based on customer feedback for a lighter alternative to the NG-7. The ULMG is fitted with the same barrel as the NG-7 SF, a 420 mm (16.5 in) long barrel that is shorter than NG-7, and it is 1.4 kg lighter than the NG-7. The ULMG can be converted to 6.5mm Creedmoor by changing barrels.
- Negev 7 ULMG SF – a compact variant of the Negev 7 ULMG, fitted with a 330 mm (13.0 in) long barrel.
- STrL5.56 – a Vietnamese copy of the Negev NG-5, chambered in 5.56×45mm NATO, shown publicly in 2024. Product of Z111 Factory.
- STrL-7,62VN – another Vietnamese Z111 copy of the Negev, however is chambered in 7.62×39mm. It is weighted 7.4 kg, featuring fluted quick-change barrel with an undisclosed length. Also shown publicly in 2024.
- Prahar – an Indian derivative of NG-7 modified to meet the requirements of the Indian Army and produced by the PLR Systems at its Small Arms Complex on the outskirts of Gwalior. It will replace the in-service INSAS LMG which is the standard automatic weapon.
- Modular AI-controlled Negev NG-7 – Indian derivative developed by BSS Materiel Limited. Testing phase underway. The gun is capable of automatic target detection, friend-foe classification, and real-time engagement. The weapon system HAS demonstrated autonomous target acquisition in challenging mountain environments with accuracy at 600 m (660 yd) and can identify and track targets up to 300 m (330 yd). The AI is designed for perimeter security, convoy protection and military base defense. It features an encrypted remote command link compatibility with ballistic adjustment to compensate wind, range and temperature, and a combination of thermal and optical sensors for precision targeting. Deployment options include static installations, on unmanned ground vehicles, tripods, and RCWS in armoured vehicles and naval platforms. The system has independent endurance of 21 days in a bunker.
  - The initial tests were conducted in Roorkee on April 5, followed by the high-altitude trials conducted at 14,500 ft (4,400 m). Further tests were conducted between 1 and 8 June 2025 by the Indian Army.

== Users ==
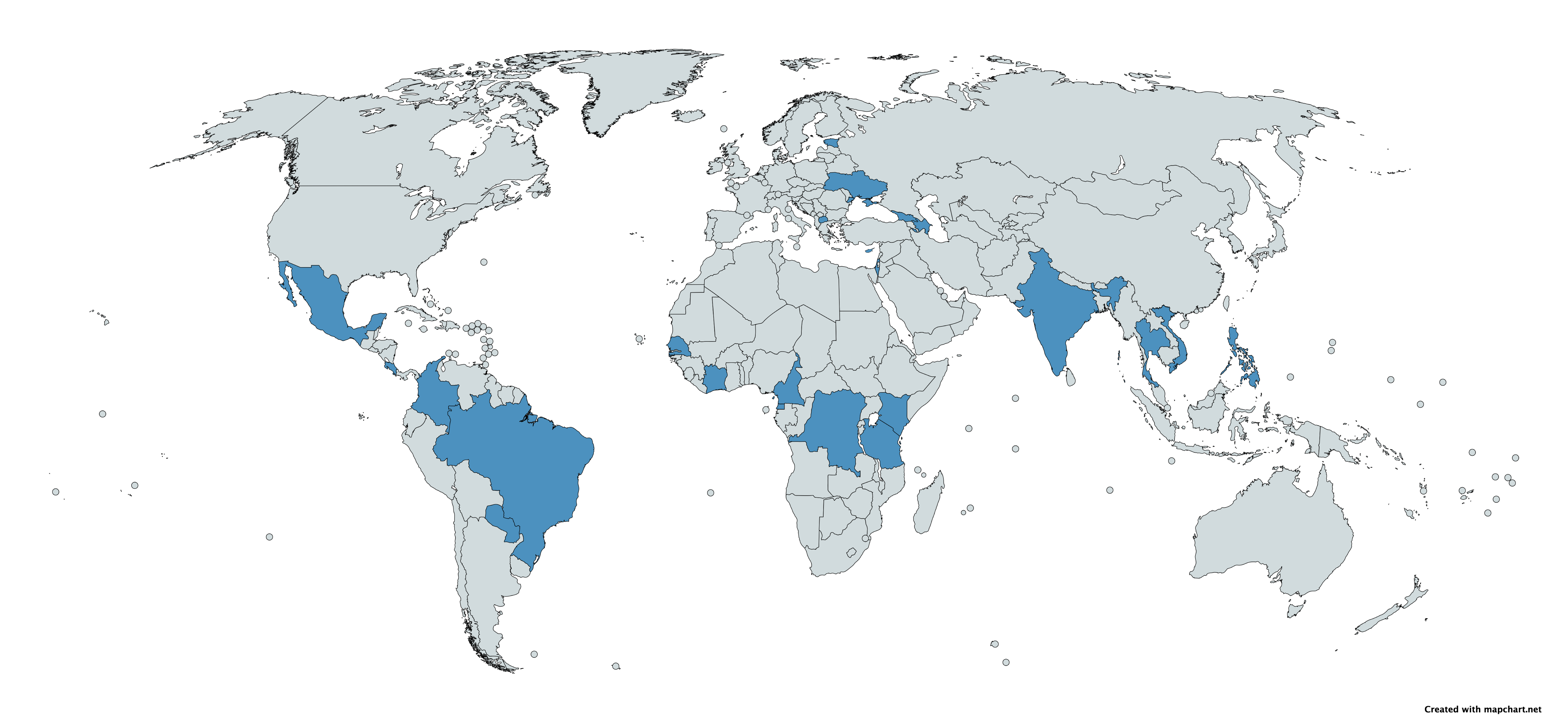
A map with Negev users in blue

- Argentina : Used by the Argentine Federal Police.
- Azerbaijan
- Brazil: Used by Military Police of São Paulo State, Military Police of Amazonas State
- Cameroon: Used by Rapid Intervention Brigade
- Colombia
- Costa Rica
- Cyprus: Used by mechanised infantry, paratroopers and the Special Forces (SF and NG-7 SF versions).
- Democratic Republic of Congo: Used by Presidential Guard units in 2010
- Equatorial Guinea
- Estonia
- Georgia: Since May 2010, standard issue light machine gun of the GAF. Heavily used by Georgian units in Afghanistan.
- India: 5.56 variant serving as standard issue LMG for Special Forces from earlier.
  - A case to procure light machine guns through Fast Track Procurement was initiated in March 2019 following failure to induct the same in a previous tender. Competitors of NG-7 included Arsenal MG-M2 and S&T Motiv K12. Trials were conducted by an IA team in late 2019. An order for 16,479 NG-7 guns was placed in March 2020 at a cost of ₹880 crore (US$119.05 million) to replace all the INSAS LMG present with the Indian Army. The first 6,000 were delivered in late January 2021 followed by the rest in October. The acceptance trials were conducted in India and the weapons were assigned to IA's frontline troops.
  - PLR Systems received a contract to supply another 41,000 Negev NG-7 light machine guns to the Indian Army in August 2024, under a project to acquire 7.62x51 mm LMGs. The guns are being produced by the Small Arms Complex near Gwalior as 'Prahar', modified to meet the requirements of the Indian Army. Prahar will replace the in-service INSAS LMG which is the standard automatic weapon. The gun has an indigenous content of 50% which will be ultimately increased to 100%. The original timeline of delivery was nine years from 2024 but the order is expected to be executed by 2029.
    - 2026: 2,000 guns were supplied from the Small Arms Complex on 28 March, eleven months ahead of schedule, with another 4,000 units to be supplied the same year.
- Israel: The Negev was adopted by the Israel Defense Forces in 1997 and the Negev NG-7 was adopted in 2012. During the Gaza war, Israeli infantry brigades started transitioning to the NG-7 model.
- Ivory Coast
- Kenya: Kenya Defense Forces
- Mexico: Mexican Federal Police
- North Macedonia: Police Special Forces
- Paraguay: Paraguayan Army.
- Philippines: Philippine National Police Maritime Group. Philippine Coast Guard
- Senegal: Used by special forces and commandos
- Tanzania: Used by Tanzanian Special Forces.
- Thailand: Purchased 1,000 machine guns in 2007, and another 550 in 2008.
- Ukraine
- Vietnam: In service with Naval Infantry.

== See also ==
- Daewoo Precision Industries K3
- FN Minimi
- M249 light machine gun
- QJY-88
