= Daewoo Precision Industries K3 =

Light machine gun

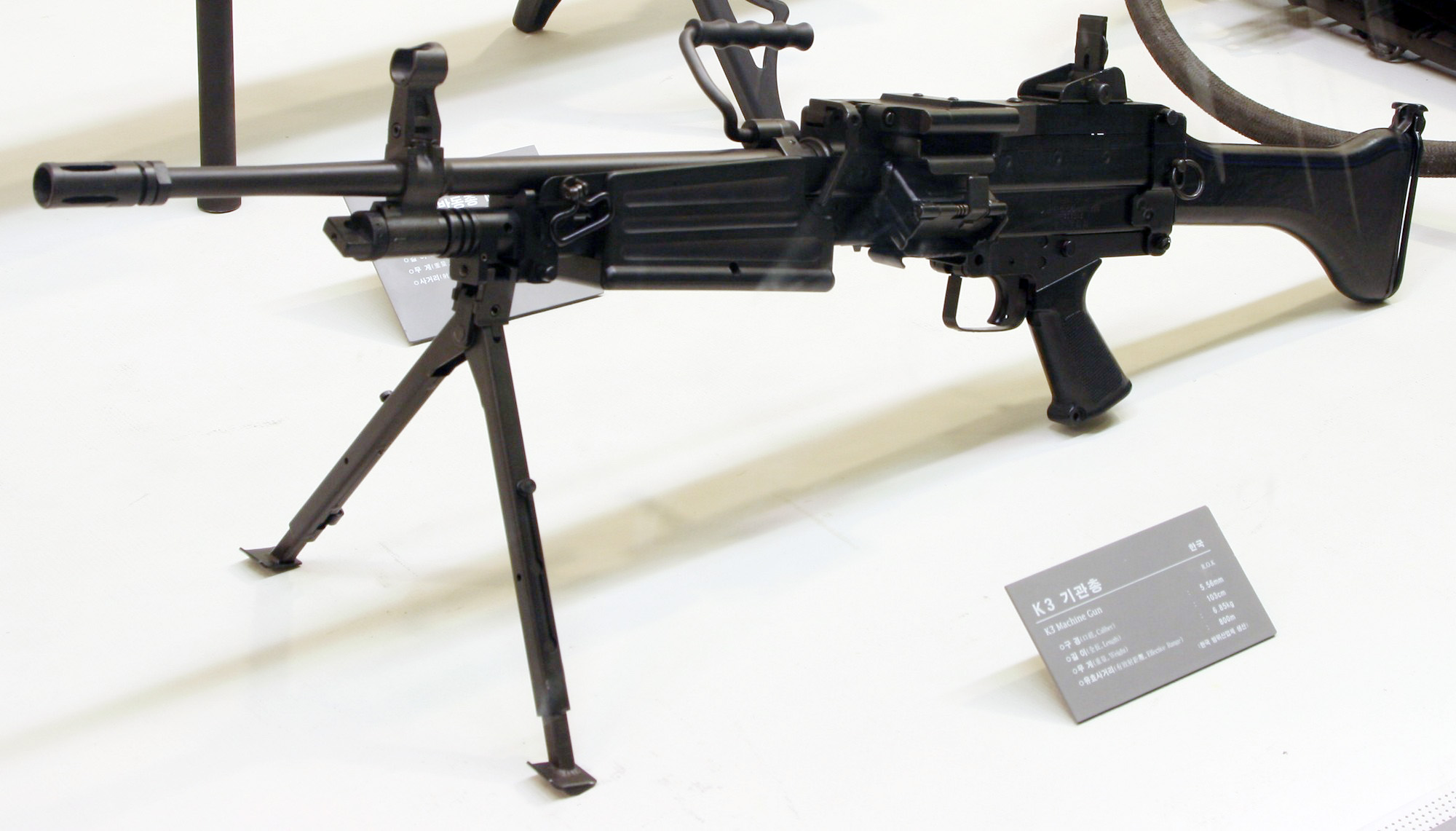
- Daewoo Precision Industries K3
- Type: Light machine gun
- Place of origin: South Korea

Service history
- In service: 1991–present
- Used by: See Users
- Wars: Colombian conflict; Gulf War; War in Afghanistan; Iraq War; Syrian Civil War; Moro conflict; Siege of Marawi; Papua conflict

Production history
- Designer: Agency for Defense Development; Daewoo Precision Industries
- Designed: 1978–87
- Manufacturer: Daewoo Precision Industries (1981-1999); Daewoo Telecom (1999-2002); Daewoo Precision (2002-2006); S&T Daewoo (2006-2012); S&T Motiv (2012-2021); SNT Motiv (2021-present)
- Produced: 1988–present

Specifications
- Mass: 6.85 kg (15.10 lb) (K3); 6.3 kg (13.89 lb) (K3 Para)
- Length: 1,030 mm (41 in) (K3); 953 mm (37.5 in) (K3 Para extended); 805 mm (31.7 in) (K3 Para collapsed)
- Barrel length: 533 mm (21.0 in) (K3); 365 mm (14.4 in) (K3 Para)
- Cartridge: 5.56×45mm NATO.223 Remington
- Action: Gas-operated, rotating bolt
- Rate of fire: 700 rounds/min belt fed 1,000 rounds/min magazine fed
- Muzzle velocity: 915 m/s (3,002 ft/s) (K3)
- Effective firing range: 800 m (875 yd) (K3 K100); 460 m (503 yd) (K3 KM193); 600 m (656 yd) (K3 KM100)
- Maximum firing range: 3,600 m (3,937 yd) (K3 K100); 2,650 m (2,898 yd) (K3 KM193)
- Feed system: 200-round disintegrating M27 ammunition belt, 70-round box magazine (rare) or 30-round NATO STANAG magazine
- Sights: Iron sights

The Daewoo Precision Industries K3 is a South Korean light machine-gun. It is the third indigenous firearm developed in South Korea by the Agency for Defense Development, following the K1 and K2 assault rifles. It is manufactured by Daewoo Precision Industries, current SNT Motiv.

== History ==
The K3 light machine gun entered service in 1989, replacing the M60 machine gun in frontline use.

This machine gun was replaced by the SNT Motiv K15 in 2022.

== Design ==
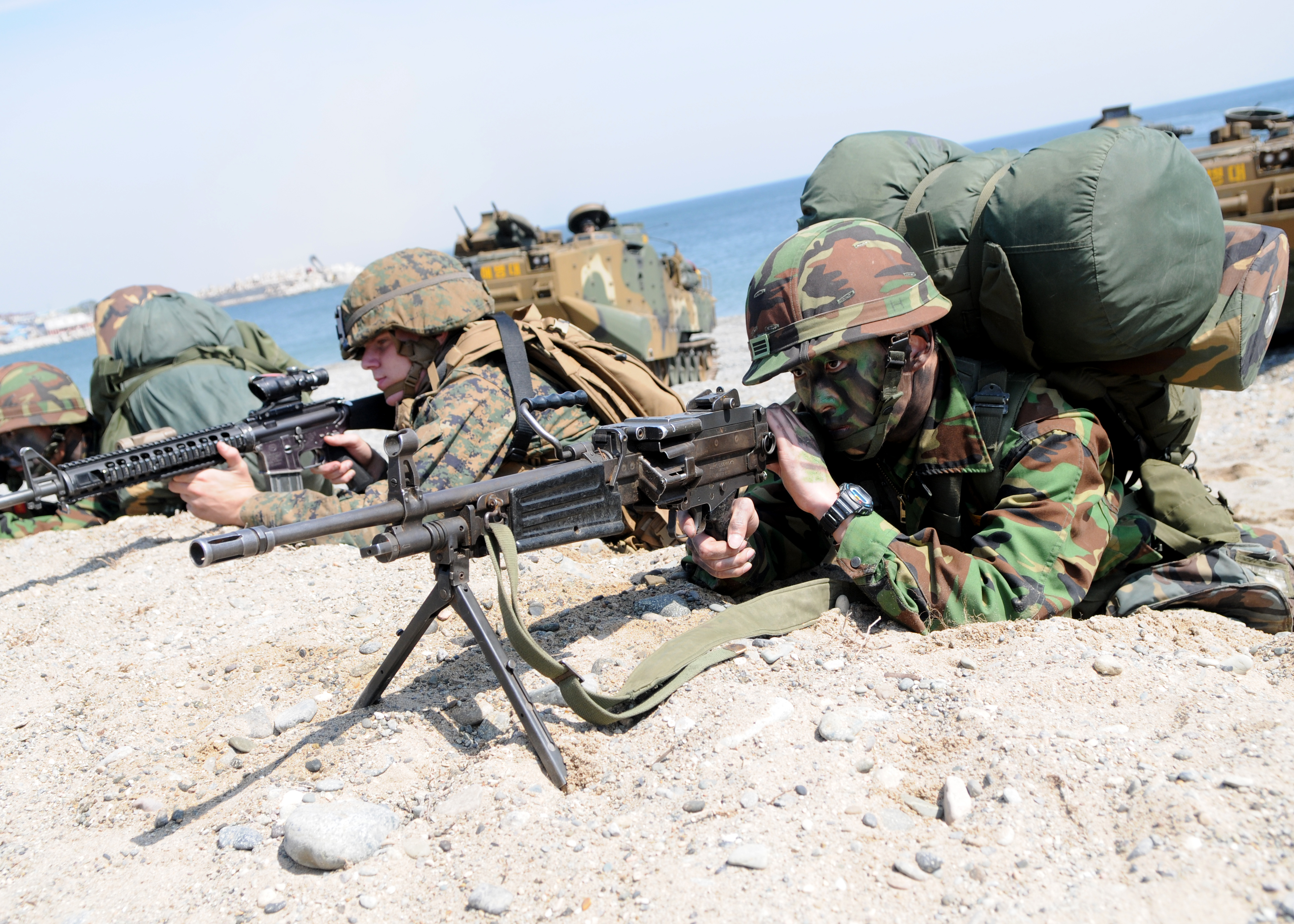
A South Korean soldier with a Daewoo K3 in March 2012

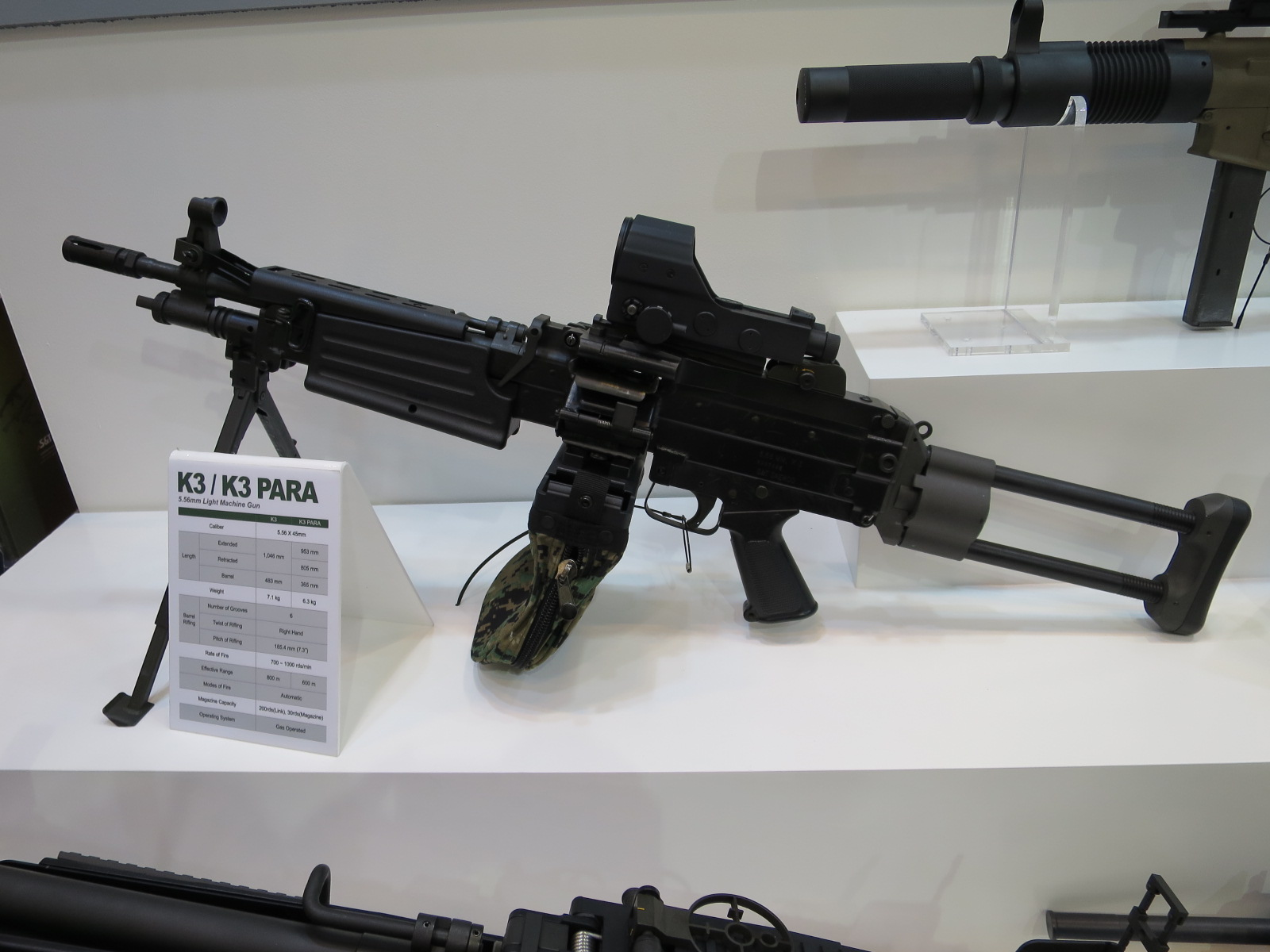
K3 Para at IDEX 2017

The K3 is a light machine gun with some visual similarity to FN Minimi and uses a standard 5.56×45mm NATO cartridge.

The K3 is capable of firing both 5.56×45mm NATO and .223 Remington rounds like the K2 assault rifle. Thus, its greatest advantage is that it is lighter than the M60 and can interchange cartridges with both the K1A and K2. The feed can come from either a 30-round box magazine or a 200-round disintegrating M27 ammunition belt. The K3 can be used with a bipod for the Squad Automatic role, and fitted with a tripod for sustained fire support.

The rear sight is adjustable for elevation and windage, and the foresight can be adjusted for elevation for zeroing. The barrel has a built-in carry handle for ease of changing the barrel. The gun is gas operated, with a rotating bolt.

The weapon system was not designed for customization, due to the fact that most soldiers of the South Korean military will not see extended use of their weapons.

== Variants ==
=== XK3 ===
Experimental prototype.

=== K3 ===
Standard mass-produced variant.

=== K3Para ===
Shortened version of K3 with RAS and minor modifications. First revealed in 2015.

=== Improved version ===
By 2015, ROK forces were looking to obtain a new LMG, as the K3 was suffering from age and reliability issues. S&T Motiv is attempting to win the contract by modernizing the K3 with a side-folding adjustable stock, an integral MIL-STD-1913 rail on feed cover, detachable side and underside rails, a carbon fiber heat shield over barrel, an improved muzzle brake/flash hider, folding iron sights, and an upgraded feed system.

The same improvements would also be applied to the shorter "Para" version. As of 2019, it has not been adopted for general service, but it has been suggested that special forces units could use it.

=== SNT Motiv K15 ===
SNT Motiv K15
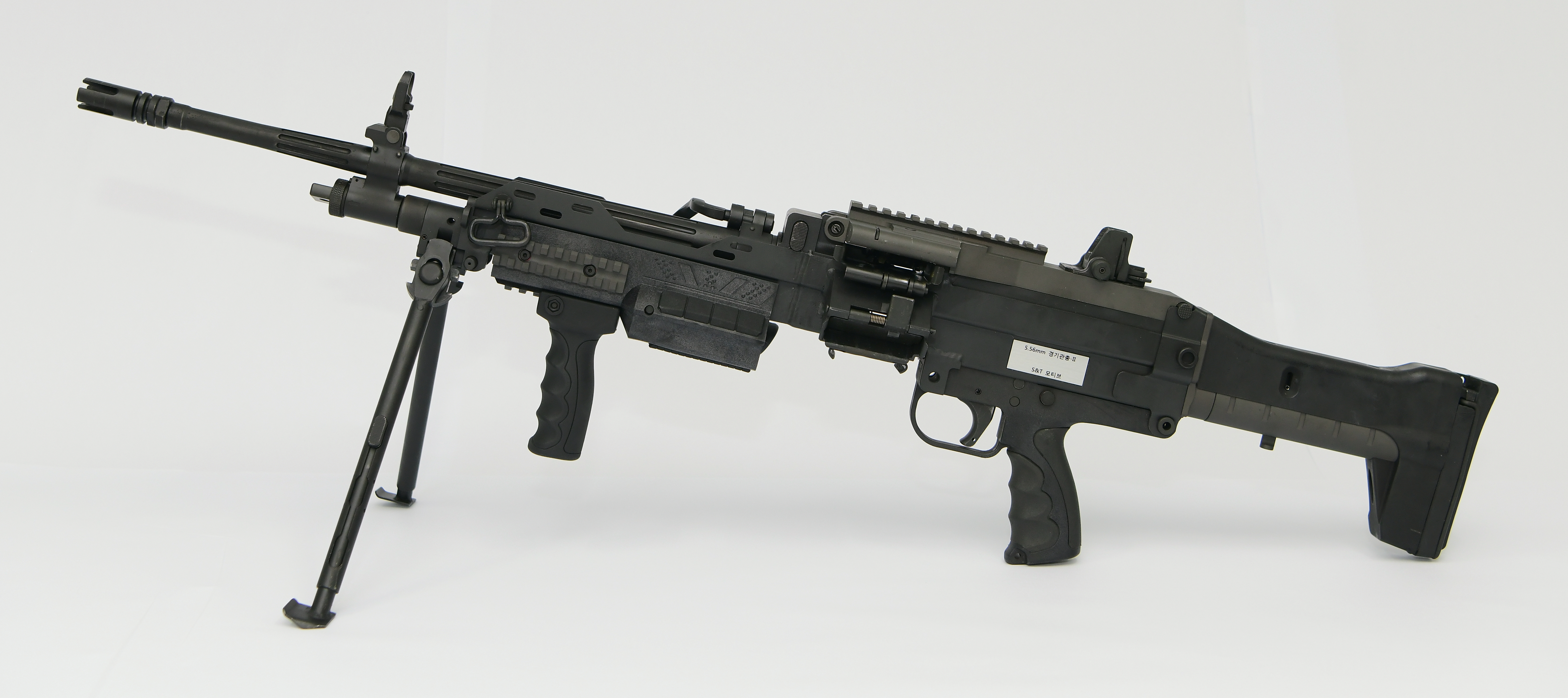
- K15 with bipod and front handgrip attached.
- Type: Light machine gun
- Place of origin: South Korea

Service history
- Used by: Republic of Korea Armed Forces

Production history
- Designer: SNT Motiv
- Designed: 2015-19
- Manufacturer: SNT Motiv
- Developed from: Daewoo Precision Industries K3
- Produced: 2021-present
- Variants: K15 and K15 Para

Specifications
- Mass: 7.1 kg
- Length: 990mm; 1070mm (with telescopic buttstock extended)
- length: 465mm

In late 2018, the S&T Motiv "Next-Generation LMG" was standardized as the K15, a heavily upgraded version of the K3 planned for fielding to the ROK Army by 2020. It has an adjustable buttstock and redesigned pistol grip/trigger group component for improved ergonomics, and internal parts are reconfigured and manufactured with closer tolerances for better reliability. Unlike the K3, it uses a push button to hold and release the barrel with three upper positioning lugs to ensure the barrel sits on a correct position when reattached. The feed cover and handguard have rails integrally attached, rather than needing an adapter to have them installed like the K3; this helps it to utilize a day/night fire control system that uses a thermal sight, laser rangefinder and ballistic computer. Each leg of the bipod operates independently to make for a more sturdy firing platform and the front sight is collapsible. The K15 is still fed from a 200-round plastic container and also can accept a STANAG magazine in emergency situations. Although the new design is more reliable, it is heavier at 7.16 kg (15.8 lb) without the FCS and 8.4 kg (19 lb) with the FCS. Deliveries began in December 2022.

==== Variants ====
===== K15 =====
Heavily redesigned and modernized version.

===== K15 Para =====
Para model of the K15.

===== Gallery =====
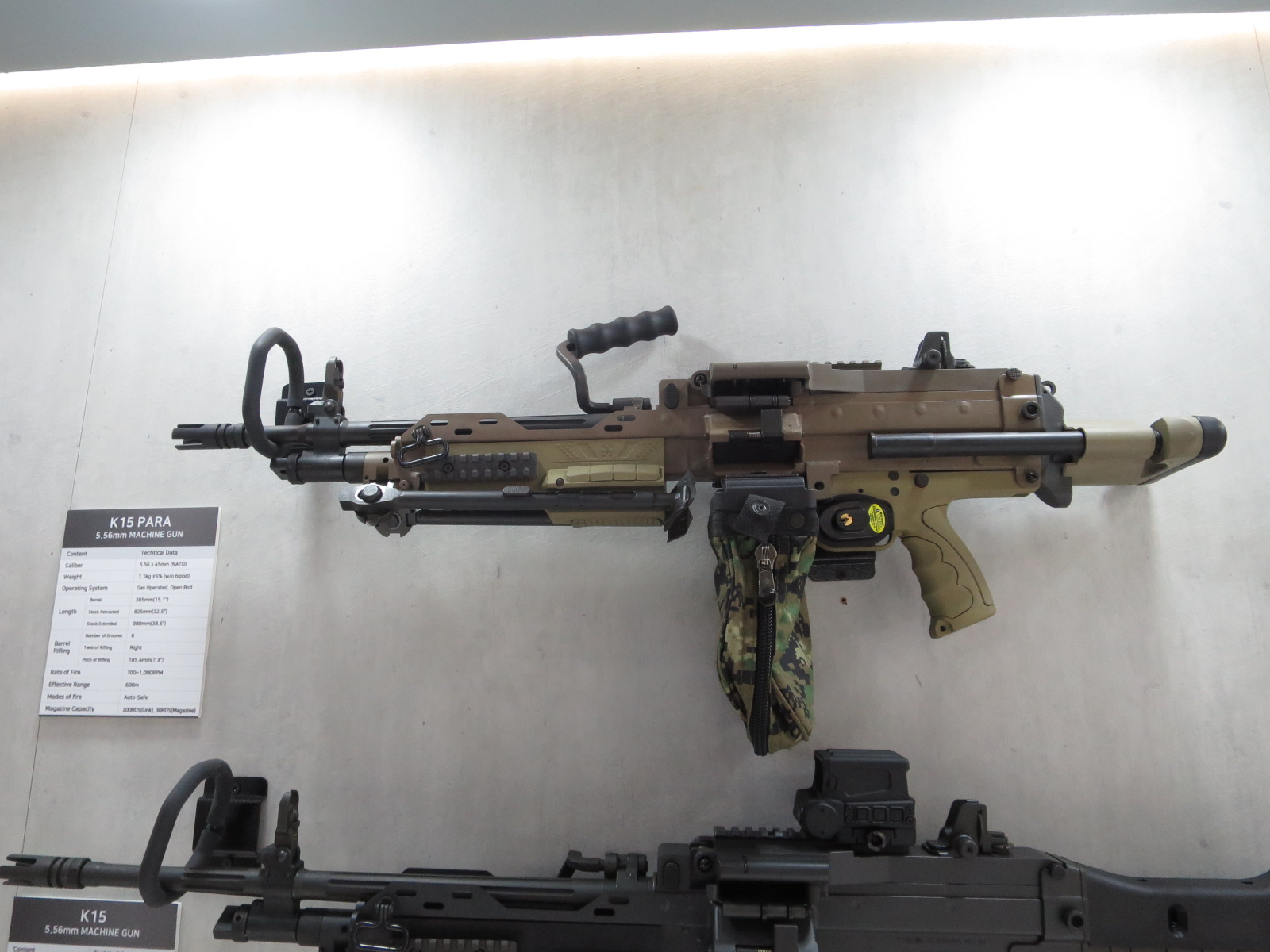
K15 Para with black and tan parts.

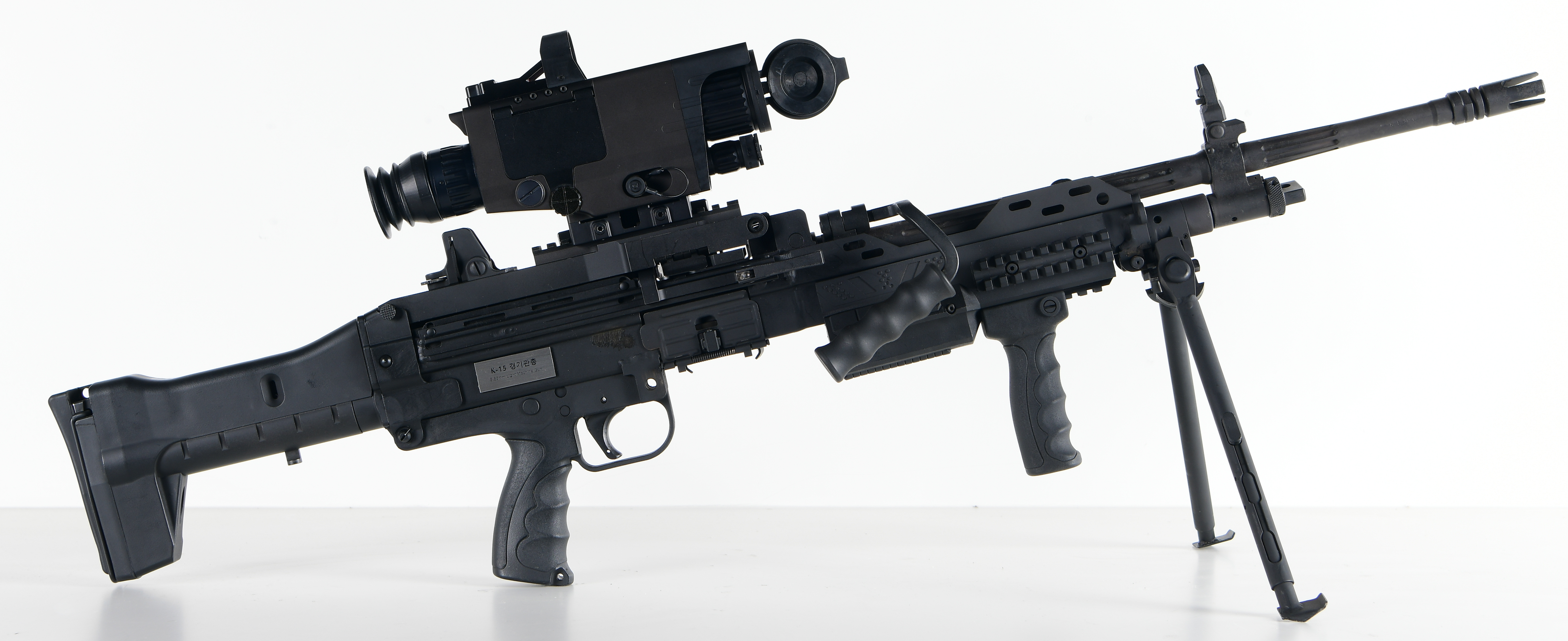
K15 standard. Fitted with Picatinny rail on the feed cover and handguard; front handgrip and day/night fire control system scope that includes a thermal sight, laser rangefinder and ballistic computer are equipped.

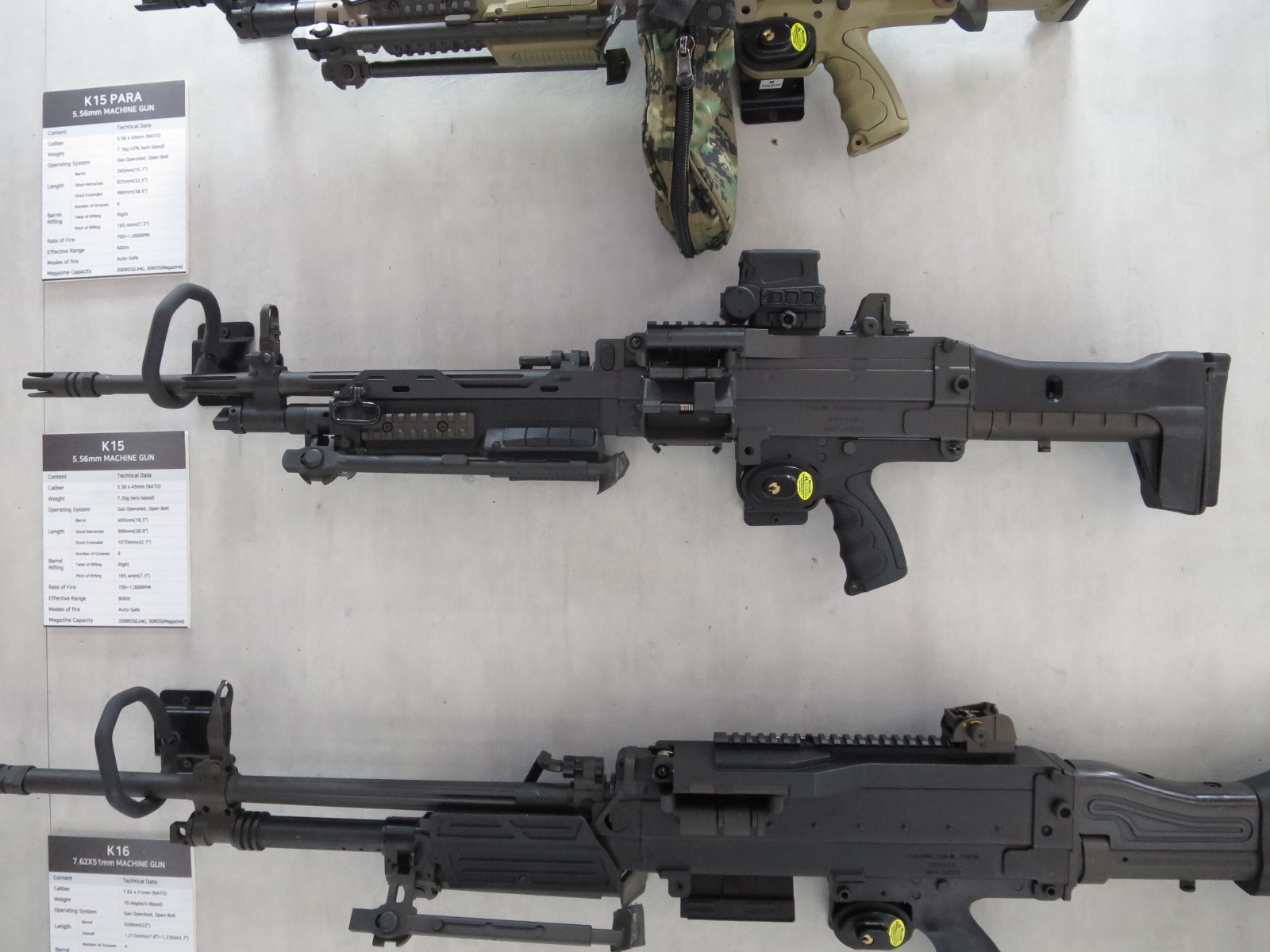
K15 at IDEX 2025. Equipped with a holographic weapon sight.

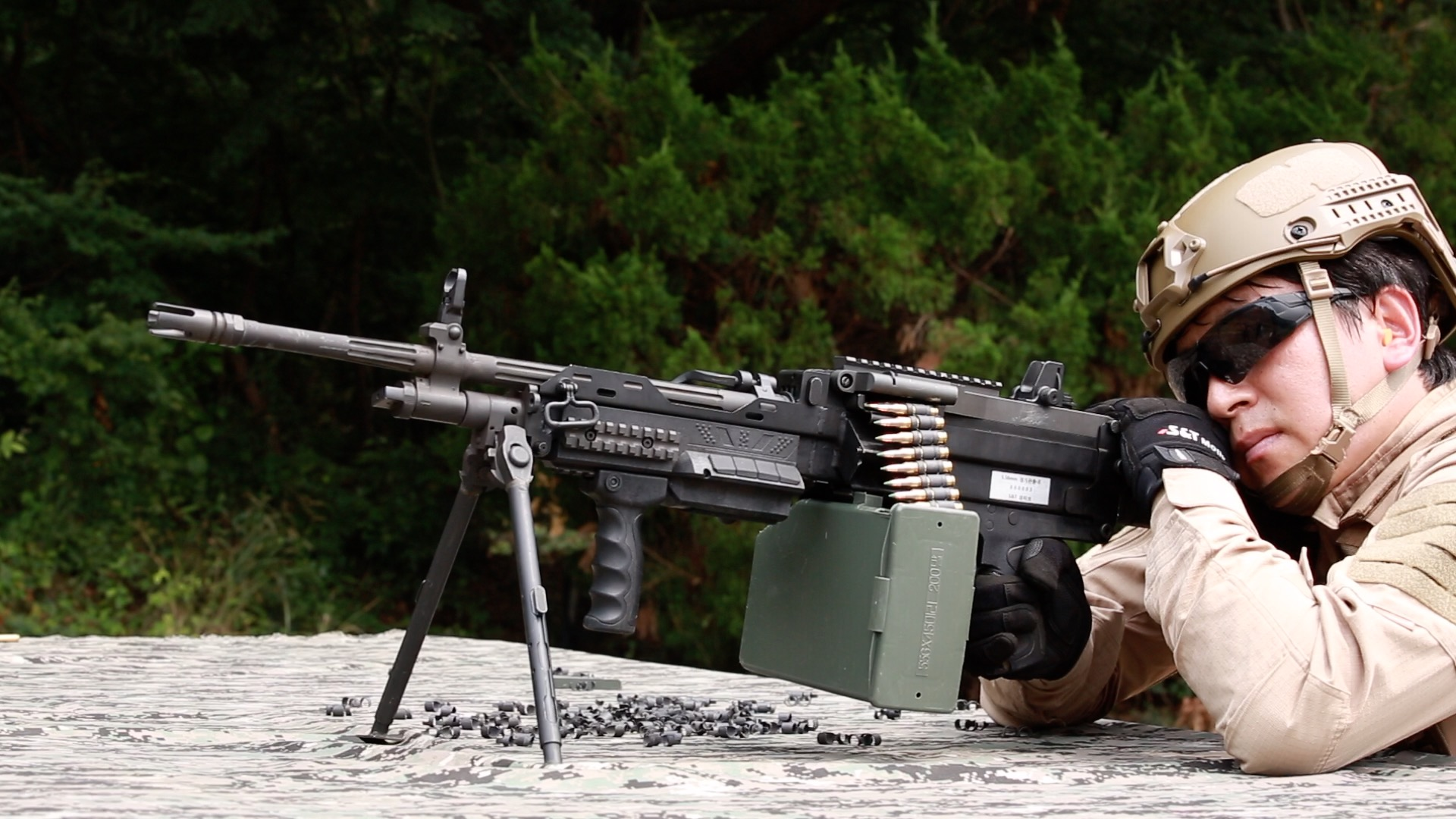
A tester firing the K15 with a polymer ammunition box attached.

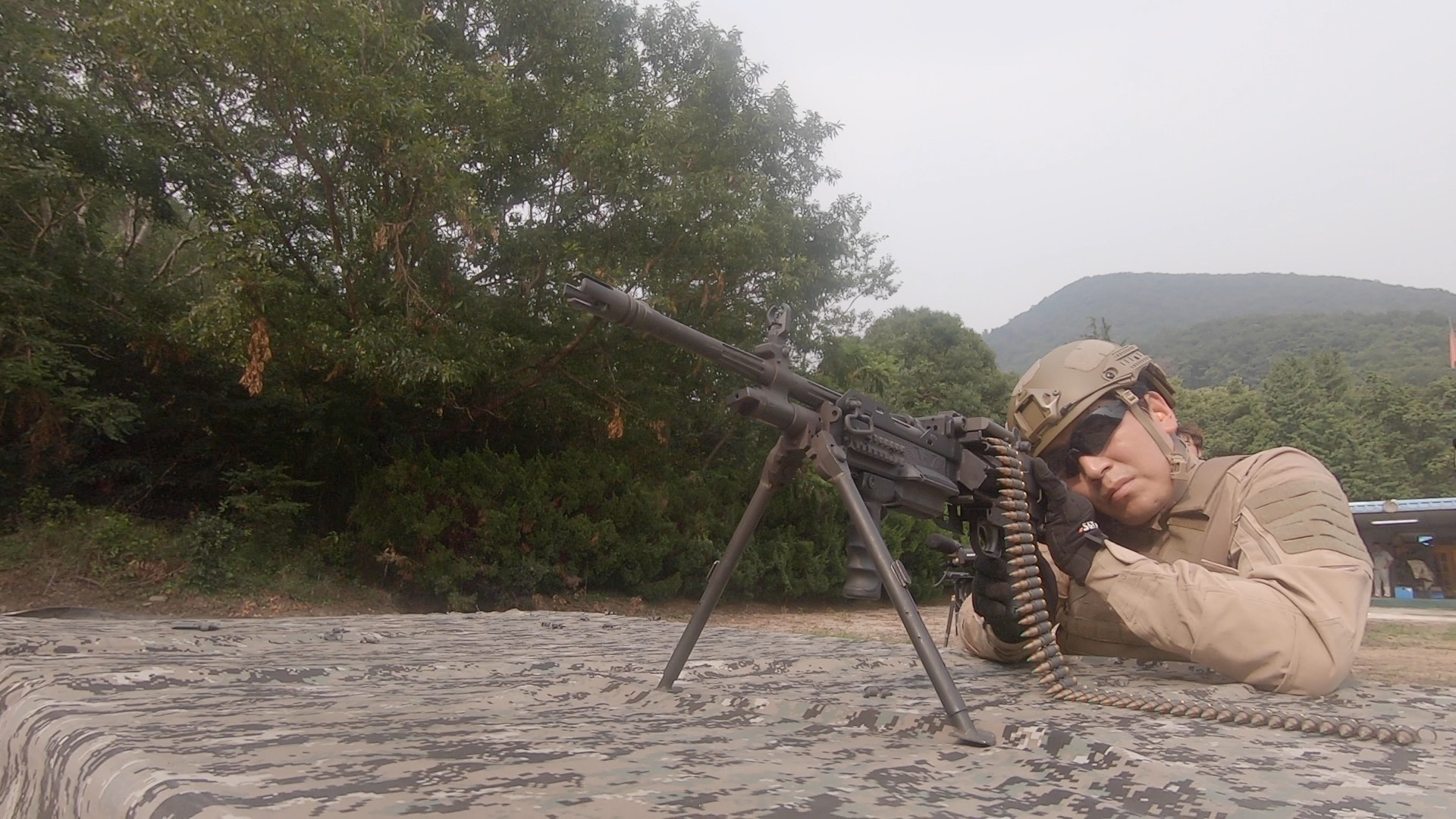
A tester firing the K15 without ammunition box; but disintegrating-link M27 ammunition belt instead.

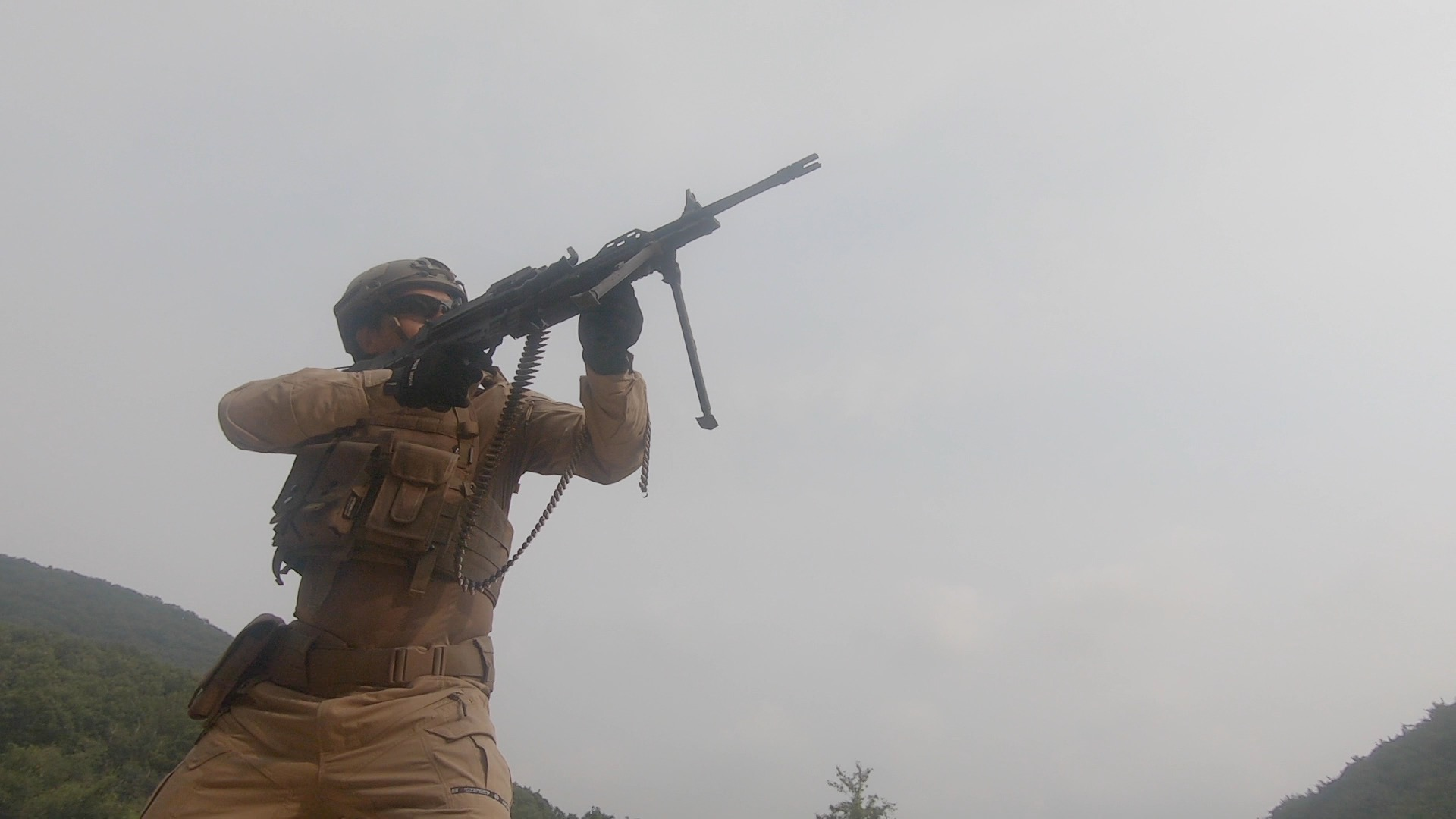
K15 at shooting range, owned by SNT Motiv Headquaters

== Foreign sales ==
One example of the K3 was purchased by South Africa in 2006, and two examples were purchased by Thailand in the same year.

A controversy broke out 2007 in the Philippines when the country's Armed Forces initially selected the FN Minimi rather than picking the K3 or the 5.56 mm Ultimax from Singapore. The AFP's Modernization Program was attacked for showing favoritism towards a Western firearms company over Asian arms manufacturers. Ultimately, 6,540 K3s were acquired by the Philippine Army for their SAW requirement. 5,883 units were first shown in public on February 18, 2008, together with 603 newly delivered Kia KM-450 trucks.

== Users ==
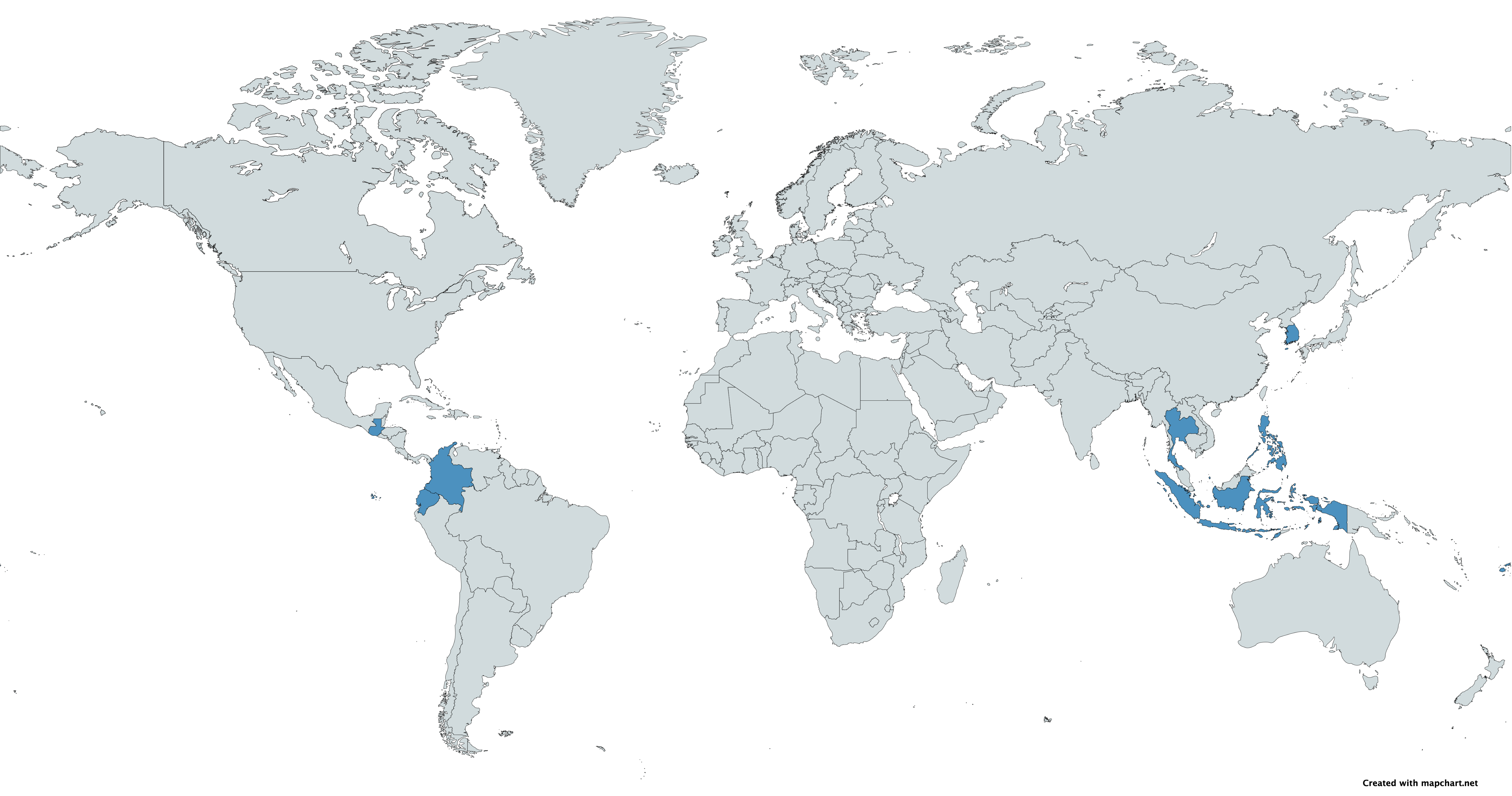
Map with K3 users in blue

- Colombia: 400 K3s acquired in 2006.
- Ecuador
- Guatemala
- Indonesia: 110 K3s acquired in 2006, and additional 803 in 2011.
- South Korea: Used as standard squad automatic weapon. Retired from active service. Replaced by K15 in 2025.
- Philippines: Philippine Army acquired 6,540 units in 2008. Philippine National Police acquired K3s in 2019.
- Thailand: 2 K3s transferred according to a 2019 SIPRI small arms report.

=== Non-state users ===
- Free Papua Movement - Captured from the Indonesian military.

== See also ==
- List of machine guns
- List of dual-feed firearms
- FN Minimi – (Belgium)
- M249 – (Belgium, United States)
- RPL-20 – (Russia)
- QJS-161 – (China)
- H&K MG4 – (Germany)
- CETME Ameli – (Spain)
- Ultimax 100 – (Singapore)
- IMI Negev – (Israel)
