= List of ships of the Republic of Korea Navy =

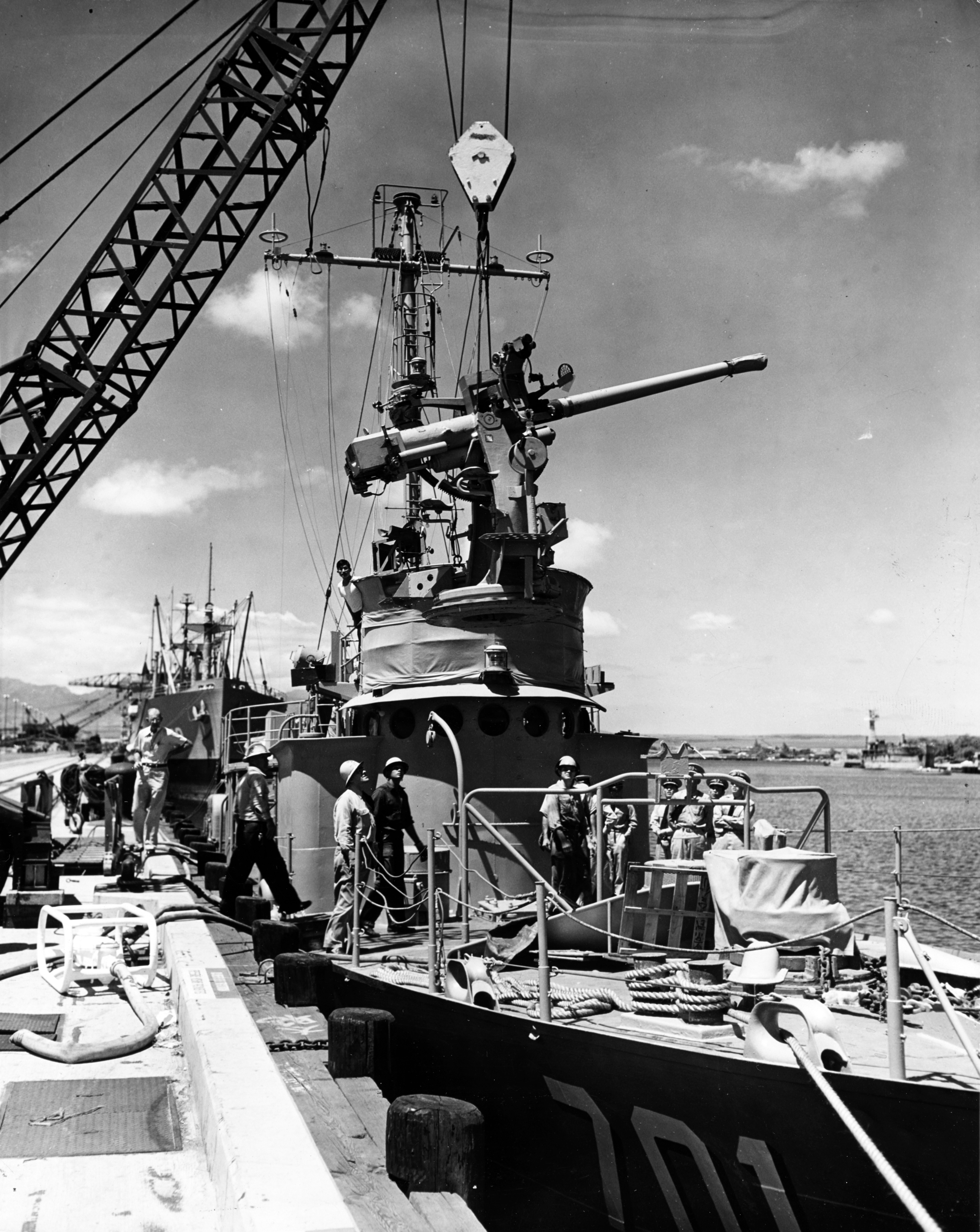
ROKS Baekdusan (PC 701), the first warship of the South Korean navy

Naval ensign of South Korea

Naval jack of South Korea

The Republic of Korea Navy was established on November 11, 1945, as the Marine Defense Group (later became the Korean Coast Guard) after Korea was liberated from the Empire of Japan on August 15, 1945. The Korean Coast Guard became the Republic of Korea Navy after the South Korean government was established on August 15, 1948.

Since its inception and until the 1990s, the Republic of Korea Navy had acquired about 150 former United States Navy ships. As South Korea's economy grew, the ROK Navy was able to build larger and better equipped fleets with local shipbuilders.

The ROK Navy employs the U.S. Navy-style letter based hull classification symbols to designate the types of its ships and hull numbers to uniquely identify its vessels (e.g. DDH 975). The names are that of the historical figures, Navy heroes, provinces, cities, counties, peaks, lakes, islands, and birds. The Chief of Naval Operations selects the names of ships.

The ship prefix for all the commissioned ROK Navy ship is ROKS (Republic of Korea Ship) when the names of ships are written in English.

== Ships acquired through indigenous warship building ==
=== Submarines ===
Dolgorae (SSM) means the dolphin in Korean.

Class	ROKN classification	Hull number	Name (a.k.a.)	Hangul name (Hanja)	Formerly known as	Displacement (submerged, tons)	Launch date	Delivery date	Commission date	Decommission date	Builder	Note
SSM 051 class	SSM: Midget Submarine	051	Dolgorae 051	돌고래 051	-	175	1983-04-02	1984-12-29	1985-03-01	2003-12-31	Korea Tacoma	Displayed at Submarine Force Command
SSM 051 class	SSM: Midget Submarine	052	Dolgorae 052	돌고래 052	-	178	1989-12-15	1990-11-07	1990-11-08	2016-06-30	Korea Tacoma	-
SSM 051 class	SSM: Midget Submarine	053	Dolgorae 053	돌고래 053	-	178	1991-08-30	1991-12-10	1991-12-12	2016-06-30	Korea Tacoma	Displayed at ROKS Seoul Park in Seoul

=== Frigates ===
Frigates (FF) were named after provinces and large cities that names previous ROK Navy destroyers had.

Class	ROKN classification	Hull number	Name (a.k.a.)	Hangul name (Hanja)	Formerly known as	Displacement (light/full, tons)	Launch date	Delivery date	Commission date	Decommission date	Builder	Note
Ulsan class	FFK →FF: Frigate	951	Ulsan	울산 (蔚山)	-	1,446/2,350	1980-04-08	1980-12-30	1981-01-01	2014-12-30	Hyundai Heavy Industries	Displayed as museum ship in Ulsan; 2nd Ulsan after AKL 910
Ulsan class	FFK →FF: Frigate	952	Seoul	서울	-	1,446/2,350	1984-04-24	1984-12-15	1984-12-18	2015-12-31	Hyundai Heavy Industries	Moored at ROKS Seoul Park in Seoul; 3rd Seoul after LCI 101, DD 92/912
Ulsan class	FFK →FF: Frigate	953	Chungnam	충남 (忠南)	-	1,446/2,350	1984-12-10	1985-06-29	1985-07-01	2017-12-27	Korea Shipbuilding Corp.	2nd Chungnam after DE 72/821
Ulsan class	FFK →FF: Frigate	955	Masan	마산 (馬山)	-	1,446/2,350	1984-10-26	1985-07-30	1985-08-07	2019-12-24	Korea Tacoma	2nd Masan after AKL 909; Participated in RIMPAC 1990 with ROKS Seoul
Ulsan class	FFK →FF: Frigate	956	Gyeongbuk (Kyong Buk)	경북 (慶北)	-	1,446/2,350	1986-01-23	1986-07-31	1986-08-01	2019-12-24	Daewoo S&ME	2nd Gyeongbuk after APD 85/826

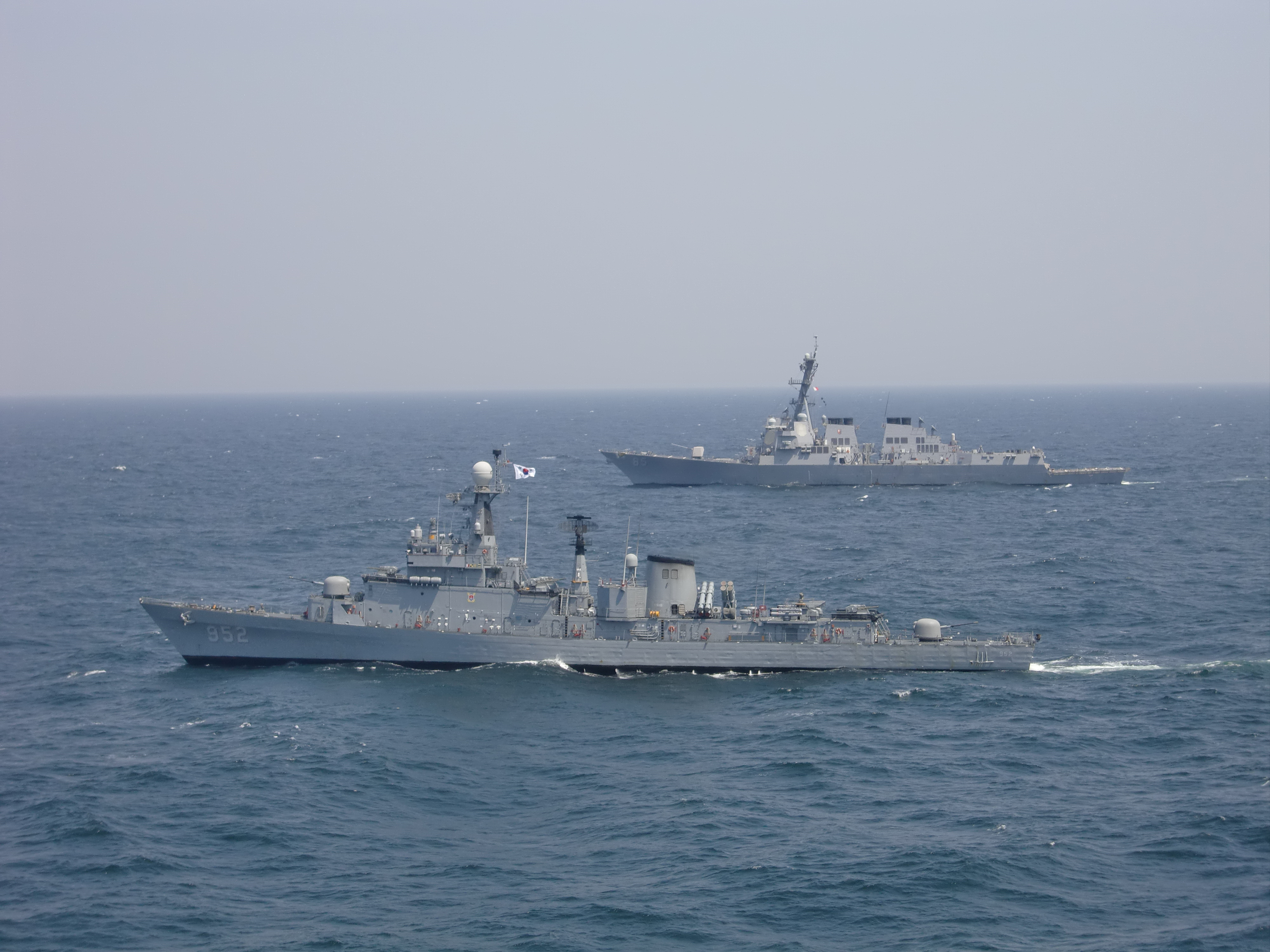
ROKS Seoul (FF 952)

=== Corvettes ===
Corvettes (PCC) were named after cities.

Class	ROKN classification	Hull number	Name (a.k.a.)	Hangul name (Hanja)	Formerly known as	Displacement (light/full, tons)	Launch date	Delivery date	Commission date	Decommission date	Builder	Note
Donghae class	PCC: Patrol Combat Corvette	751	Donghae	동해 (東海)	-	890/1,076	1982-11-18	1983-11-10	1983-12-21	2009-06-30	Korea Shipbuilding Corp.	Lead ship of PCC Batch-I
Donghae class	PCC: Patrol Combat Corvette	752	Suwon	수원 (水原)	-	890/1,076	1982-12-28	1983-11-30	1983-12-21	2010-06-30	Korea Tacoma	-
Donghae class	PCC: Patrol Combat Corvette	753	Gangneung	강릉 (江陵)	-	890/1,076	1983-05-14	1983-12-01	1983-12-21	2010-06-30	Hyundai Heavy Industries	2nd Gangneung after YMS 507
Donghae class	PCC: Patrol Combat Corvette	755	Anyang	안양 (安養)	-	890/1,087	1983-06-15	1983-12-15	1983-12-21	2011-09-30	Daewoo Heavy Industries	Recommissioned as ARC Nariño (CM 55) of the Colombian Navy in Aug 2014
Pohang class	PCC: Patrol Combat Corvette	756	Pohang	포항 (浦項)	-	950/1,220	1984-02-07	1984-10-31	1984-12-18	2009-06-30	Korea Shipbuilding Corp.	Lead ship of PCC Batch-II; Moored as museum ship in Pohang
Pohang class	PCC: Patrol Combat Corvette	757	Gunsan	군산 (群山)	-	950/1,220	1984-03-27	1984-11-30	1984-12-17	2011-09-30	Korea Tacoma	Scrapped; 2nd Gunsan after AKL 908
Pohang class	PCC: Patrol Combat Corvette	758	Gyeongju	경주 (慶州)	-	950/1,220	1984-06-08	1985-04-30	1985-05-01	2014-12-30	Hyundai Heavy Industries	Recommissioned as BAP Ferré (PM 211) of Peruvian Navy in Jul 2016; 2nd Gyeongju after YMS 502
Pohang class	PCC: Patrol Combat Corvette	759	Mokpo	목포 (木浦)	-	950/1,220	1984-10-12	1985-05-10	1985-05-17	2014-12-30	Daewoo Heavy Industries	2nd Mokpo after AKL 907
Pohang class	PCC: Patrol Combat Corvette	761	Gimcheon	김천 (金泉)	-	950/1,220	1985-11-29	1986-08-31	1986-09-01	2015-12-31	Korea Shipbuilding Corp.	Lead ship of PCC Batch-III; Recommissioned as HQ 18 of Vietnam People's Navy in Jun 2017; 2nd Gimcheon after YMS 513
Pohang class	PCC: Patrol Combat Corvette	762	Chungju	충주 (忠州)	-	950/1,220	1986-01-24	1986-09-30	1986-11-30	2016-12-31	Korea Tacoma	Transferred to Philippine Navy as BRP Conrado Yap (PS 39)
Pohang class	PCC: Patrol Combat Corvette	763	Jinju	진주 (晋州)	-	950/1,220	1986-02-12	1986-10-29	1986-11-01	2016-12-31	Hyundai Heavy Industries	Recommissioned as Shabab Misr (1000) of Egyptian Navy in 2007; 2nd Jinju after LCI 102
Pohang class	PCC: Patrol Combat Corvette	765	Yeosu	여수 (麗水)	-	950/1,220	1986-06-14	1986-11-28	1986-12-01	2017-12-27	Daewoo Heavy Industries	Recommissioned as HQ 20 of Vietnam People's Navy in 2018
Pohang class	PCC: Patrol Combat Corvette	766	Jinhae	진해 (鎭海)	-	950/1,220	1987-03-18	1988-07-02	1988-09-30	2017-12-27	Hyundai Heavy Industries	Lead ship of PCC Batch-IV
Pohang class	PCC: Patrol Combat Corvette	767	Suncheon	순천 (順天)	-	950/1,220	1987-04-03	1988-07-30	1988-09-30	2019-12-24	Korea Tacoma	2nd Suncheon after PCE 1002/712
Pohang class	PCC: Patrol Combat Corvette	768	Iksan	익산 (益山)	Iri (이리; 裡里)	950/1,220	1987-03-24	1988-09-13	-	2018-12-31	Hyundai Heavy Industries	Name changed from Iri to Iksan on Feb 1, 1999
Pohang class	PCC: Patrol Combat Corvette	771	Andong	안동 (安東)	-	971/1,273	1988-05-28	1988-12-29	1989-01-05	2020-12-31	Korea Shipbuilding Corp.	2nd Andong after LST 803
Pohang class	PCC: Patrol Combat Corvette	772	Cheonan	천안 (天安)	-	972/1,223	1987-07-24	1988-12-30	1989-01-05	2010-06-11	Korea Tacoma	On March 26, 2010, ROKS Cheonan was sunk by a North Korean torpedo, resulting in death of 46 sailors; Wreckage displayed at 2nd Fleet; 3rd Cheonan after LCI 101, LST 801

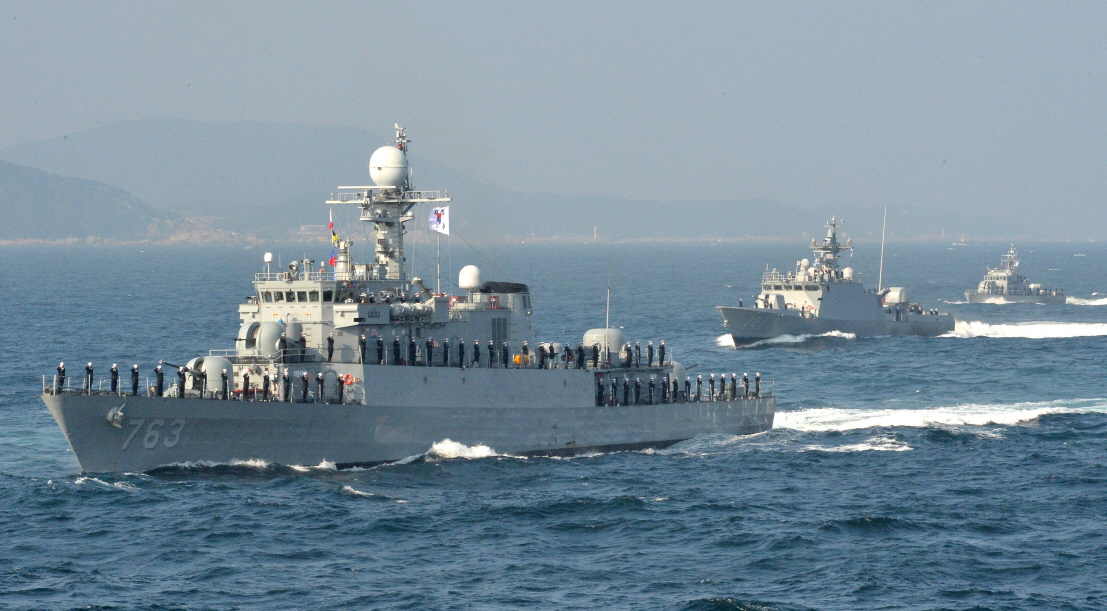
ROKS Jinju (PCC 763)

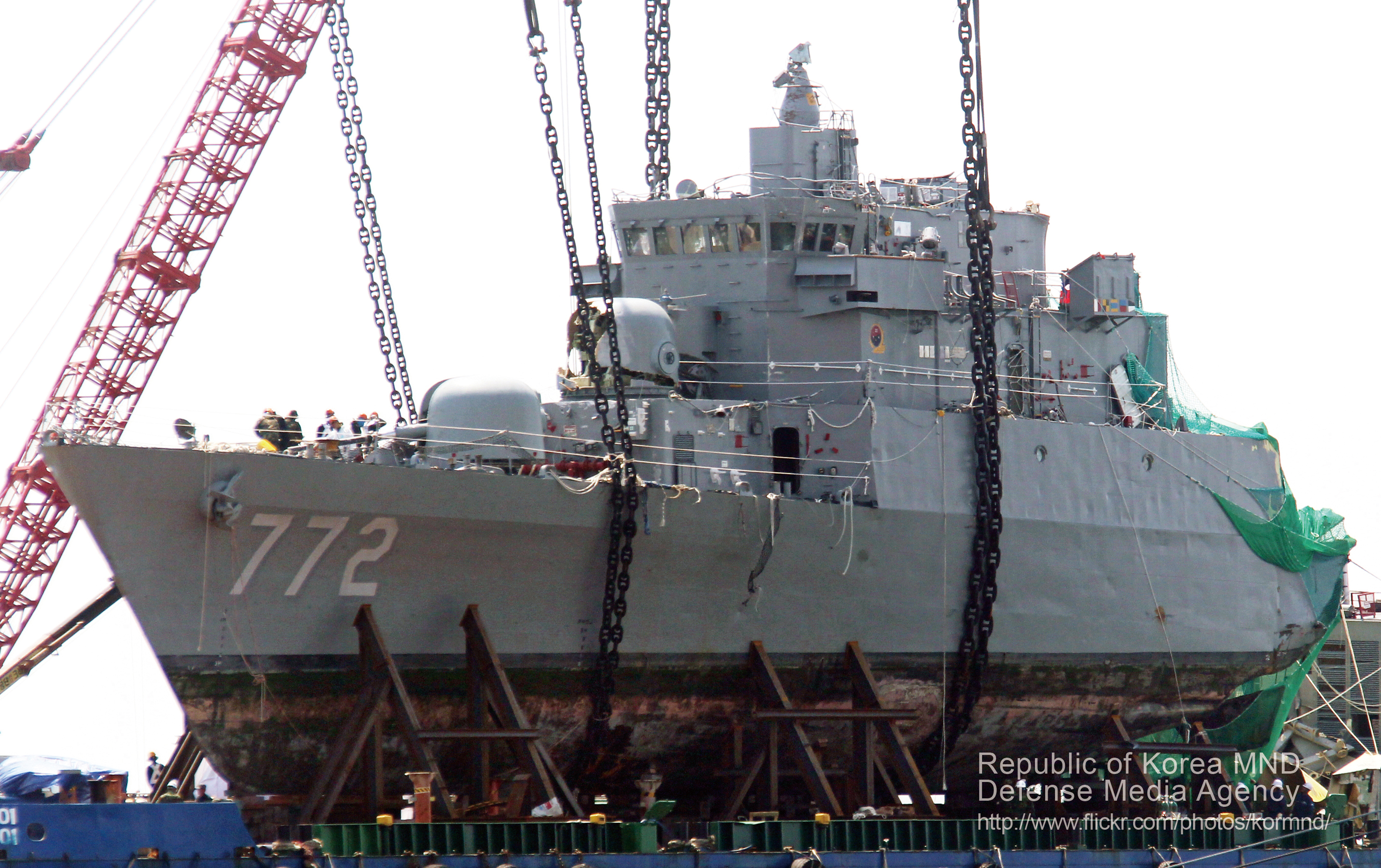
Salvaging ROKS Cheonan off Baengnyeong Island in 2010

=== Patrol craft ===
Patrol craft were named for birds.

==== Baekgu class ====
Baekgu means the seagull in Korean. Geomdoksuri means the golden eagle in Korean.

Class	ROKN classification	Hull number	Name (a.k.a.)	Hangul name (Hanja)	Formerly known as	Displacement (light/full, tons)	Launch date	Delivery date	Commission date	Decommission date	Builder	Note
Asheville class	PGM: Patrol Gunboat Missile (aka PSMM)	11 →101(1974) →351^{a} →581	Baekgu 11 →Baekgu 101 (1974) →Baekgu 51^{a} →Geomdoksuri 581	백구 11/101/51 →검독수리 581	USS Benicia (PG-96)	186/240	1969-12-20	1971-10-15	1972-02-21	1996-10-31	Tacoma Boatbuilding Co.	Delivered in San Diego
PGM 102 class	PGM: Patrol Gunboat Missile (aka PSMM)	102 →352^{a} →582	Geomdoksuri 582	검독수리 582	Baekgu 102 →Baekgu 52^{a}	180/260	-	1974-12-02	1975-04-29	1996-10-31	Tacoma Boatbuilding Co.	Armed w/ 2 Standard ARM
PGM 102 class	PGM: Patrol Gunboat Missile (aka PSMM)	103 →353^{a} →583	Geomdoksuri 583	검독수리 582	Baekgu 103 →Baekgu 53^{a}	180/260	-	1975-03-06	1975-04-29	1996-12-28	Tacoma Boatbuilding Co.	Armed w/ 2 Standard ARM
PGM 102 class	PGM: Patrol Gunboat Missile (aka PSMM)	105 →355^{a} →585	Geomdoksuri 585	검독수리 585	Baekgu 105 →Baekgu 55^{a}	180/260	1975-04-22	1975-09-27	1975-09-27	1997-06-30	Korea Tacoma	Armed w/ 2 Standard ARM; Assembled in S. Korea
PGM 106 class	PGM: Patrol Gunboat Missile (aka PSMM)	106 →356^{a} →586	Geomdoksuri 586	검독수리 586	Baekgu 106 →Baekgu 56^{a}	180/260	-	1977-08-15	1978-04-15	1998-07-31	Korea Tacoma	Armed w/ 4 Harpoon missiles
PGM 106 class	PGM: Patrol Gunboat Missile (aka PSMM)	107 →357^{a} →587	Geomdoksuri 587	검독수리 587	Baekgu 107 →Baekgu 57^{a}	180/260	-	1977-09-15	1978-04-15	1998-02-28	Korea Tacoma	Armed w/ 4 Harpoon missiles
PGM 106 class	PGM: Patrol Gunboat Missile (aka PSMM)	108 →358^{a} →588	Geomdoksuri 588	검독수리 588	Baekgu 108 →Baekgu 58^{a}	180/260	-	1978-05-31	1978-08-01	1998-02-28	Korea Tacoma	Armed w/ 4 Harpoon missiles
PGM 106 class	PGM: Patrol Gunboat Missile (aka PSMM)	109 →359^{a} →589	Geomdoksuri 589	검독수리 589	Baekgu 109 →Baekgu 59^{a}	180/260	-	1977-12-15	1978-06-01	1998-07-31	Korea Tacoma	Armed w/ 4 Harpoon missiles; Built by Tacoma Boatbuilding Co. thru sub contract
PGM 106 class	PGM: Patrol Gunboat Missile (aka PSMM)	111 →361^{a} →591	Geomdoksuri 591	검독수리 591	Baekgu 111 →Baekgu 61^{a}	180/260	-	1978-02-04	1978-06-01	1998-07-31	Korea Tacoma	Built by Tacoma Boatbuilding Co. thru sub contract

==== Chamsuri class ====
Gireogi means wild goose in Korean. Chamsuri means the sea eagle in Korean.

Class	ROKN classification	Hull number	Name (a.k.a.)	Hangul name (Hanja)	Formerly known as	Displacement (light/full, tons)	Launch date	Delivery date	Commission date	Decommission date	Builder	Note
KIST Boat class	PKM →PKMM: Patrol Killer Medium Missile →PKM	PBK 10 →PKM 121 →PKMM 271^{a} →PKM 271	Chamsuri 271	참수리 271	Gireogi 121 →Gireogi 71^{a}	105/120	-	1971-01-18	1974-01-01	1996-11-30	Naval Ship Yard (해군공창)	Armed w/ 2 Exocet missiles as PKMM
KIST Boat class	PKM →PKMM: Patrol Killer Medium Missile →PKM	PBK 11 →PKM 122 →PKMM 272^{a} →PKM 272	Chamsuri 272	참수리 271	Gireogi 122 →Gireogi 72^{a}	127/133	-	1974-03-31	1974-04-30	1996-11-30	Naval Ship Yard	Armed w/ 2 Exocet missiles as PKMM
CPIC class (Coastal Patrol and Interdiction Craft)	PKM: Patrol Killer Medium	123 →211^{a}	Gireogi 123 →Gireogi 11^{a}	기러기 123 →기러기 11	-	52/74	-	1975-08-01	1975-08-01	-	Tacoma Boatbuilding Co.	Aluminum hull
PKM 212 class	PKM: Patrol Killer Medium	212	Chamsuri 212	참수리 212	Gireogi 12	108/126	-	1978-03-31	1978-05-08	1995	Korea Shipbuilding Corp.	-
PKM 212 class	PKM: Patrol Killer Medium	213	Chamsuri 213	참수리 213	Gireogi 13	108/126	-	1978-04-15	1978-05-08	-	Korea Shipbuilding Corp.	Transferred to Bangladesh Navy in 2000 as P1012
PKM 212 class	PKM: Patrol Killer Medium	215	Chamsuri 215	참수리 215	Gireogi 15	108/126	-	1978-06-03	1978-06-15	2003	Korea Shipbuilding Corp.	-
PKM 216 class (34 in class)	PKM: Patrol Killer Medium	216	Chamsuri 216	참수리 216	Gireogi 16	112/147	-	1978-11-15	1978-11-20	-	Korea Shipbuilding Corp.	-
PKM 216 class (34 in class)	PKM: Patrol Killer Medium	217	Chamsuri 217	참수리 217	Gireogi 17	112/147	-	1978-11-24	1978-12-11	-	Korea Shipbuilding Corp.	-
PKM 216 class (34 in class)	PKM: Patrol Killer Medium	218	Chamsuri 218	참수리 218	Gireogi 18	112/147	-	1978-11-30	1978-12-11	-	Korea Shipbuilding Corp.	-
PKM 216 class (34 in class)	PKM: Patrol Killer Medium	219	Chamsuri 219	참수리 219	Gireogi 19	112/147	-	1978-11-16	1978-11-20	-	Korea Tacoma	Display in Hwacheon
PKM 216 class (34 in class)	PKM: Patrol Killer Medium	221	Chamsuri 221	참수리 221	Gireogi 21	112/147	-	1978-11-30	1978-12-11	-	Korea Tacoma	-
PKM 216 class (34 in class)	PKM: Patrol Killer Medium	222	Chamsuri 222	참수리 222	Gireogi 22	112/147	-	1978-11-30	1978-12-11	-	Korea Tacoma	-
PKM 216 class (34 in class)	PKM: Patrol Killer Medium	223	Chamsuri 223	참수리 223	Gireogi 23	-	-	-	-	-	-	Transferred to Philippine Navy in 2006 as PG 118
PKM 216 class (34 in class)	PKM: Patrol Killer Medium	225	Chamsuri 225	참수리 225	Gireogi 25	-	-	-	-	-	-	Transferred to Philippine Navy in 1995 as PG 110
PKM 216 class (34 in class)	PKM: Patrol Killer Medium	226	Chamsuri 226	참수리 226	Gireogi 26	-	-	-	-	-	-	Transferred to Philippine Navy in 1995 as PG 118
PKM 216 class (34 in class)	PKM: Patrol Killer Medium	227	Chamsuri 227	참수리 227	Gireogi 27	-	-	-	-	-	-	-
PKM 216 class (34 in class)	PKM: Patrol Killer Medium	228	Chamsuri 228	참수리 228	Gireogi 28	-	-	-	-	-	-	Displayed at Changwon Moonsung Univ.
PKM 216 class (34 in class)	PKM: Patrol Killer Medium	229	Chamsuri 229	참수리 229	Gireogi 29	-	-	-	-	-	-	Transferred to Philippine Navy in 1995 as PG 112
PKM 216 class (34 in class)	PKM: Patrol Killer Medium	231	Chamsuri 231	참수리 231	Gireogi 31	-	-	-	-	-	-	Transferred to Philippine Navy in 1995 as PG 114
PKM 216 class (34 in class)	PKM: Patrol Killer Medium	232	Chamsuri 232	참수리 232	Gireogi 32	-	-	-	-	-	-	Transferred to Philippine Navy in 1995 as PG 115
PKM 216 class (34 in class)	PKM: Patrol Killer Medium	233	Chamsuri 233	참수리 233	Gireogi 33	-	-	-	-	-	-	Transferred to Kazakhstan Navy in 2004 as RK 033
PKM 216 class (34 in class)	PKM: Patrol Killer Medium	235	Chamsuri 235	참수리 235	Gireogi 35	-	-	-	-	-	-	Transferred to Philippine Navy in 2006 as PG 117
PKM 216 class (34 in class)	PKM: Patrol Killer Medium	236	Chamsuri 236	참수리 236	Gireogi 36	-	-	-	-	-	-	-
PKM 216 class (34 in class)	PKM: Patrol Killer Medium	237	Chamsuri 237	참수리 237	Gireogi 37	-	-	-	-	-	-	Transferred to Ghana Navy in 2010 as P33
PKM 216 class (34 in class)	PKM: Patrol Killer Medium	238	Chamsuri 238	참수리 238	Gireogi 38	-	-	-	-	-	-	-
PKM 216 class (34 in class)	PKM: Patrol Killer Medium	239	Chamsuri 239	참수리 239	Gireogi 39	-	-	-	-	-	-	Transferred to Kazakhstan Navy in 2004 as RK 032
PKM 216 class (34 in class)	PKM: Patrol Killer Medium	251	Chamsuri 251	참수리 251	Gireogi 51	-	-	-	-	-	-	Transferred to Kazakhstan Navy in 2004 as RK 031
PKM 216 class (34 in class)	PKM: Patrol Killer Medium	252	Chamsuri 252	참수리 252	Gireogi 52	-	-	-	-	-	-	-
PKM 216 class (34 in class)	PKM: Patrol Killer Medium	253	Chamsuri 253	참수리 253	Gireogi 53	-	-	-	-	-	-	-
PKM 216 class (34 in class)	PKM: Patrol Killer Medium	255	Chamsuri 255	참수리 255	Gireogi 55	-	-	-	-	-	-	-
PKM 216 class (34 in class)	PKM: Patrol Killer Medium	256	Chamsuri 256	참수리 256	Gireogi 56	-	-	-	-	-	-	-
PKM 216 class (34 in class)	PKM: Patrol Killer Medium	257	Chamsuri 257	참수리 257	Gireogi 57	-	-	-	-	2013-12-31	-	-
PKM 216 class (34 in class)	PKM: Patrol Killer Medium	258	Chamsuri 258	참수리 258	Gireogi 58	-	-	-	-	-	-	-
PKM 216 class (34 in class)	PKM: Patrol Killer Medium	259	Chamsuri 259	참수리 259	Gireogi 59	-	-	-	-	-	-	-
PKM 216 class (34 in class)	PKM: Patrol Killer Medium	261	Chamsuri 261	참수리 261	Gireogi 61	-	-	-	-	-	-	-
PKM 216 class (34 in class)	PKM: Patrol Killer Medium	262	Chamsuri 262	참수리 262	Gireogi 62	-	-	-	-	2013-12-31	-	-
PKM 216 class (34 in class)	PKM: Patrol Killer Medium	263	Chamsuri 263	참수리 263	Gireogi 63	-	-	-	-	2013-12-31	-	Displayed in Yeongheungdo
PKM 216 class (34 in class)	PKM: Patrol Killer Medium	265	Chamsuri 265	참수리 265	Gireogi 65	-	-	-	-	-	-	-
PKM 216 class (34 in class)	PKM: Patrol Killer Medium	266	Chamsuri 266	참수리 266	Gireogi 66	-	-	-	-	-	-	-
PKM 216 class (34 in class)	PKM: Patrol Killer Medium	267	Chamsuri 267	참수리 267	Gireogi 67	-	-	1982-08-29	-	2014-01-xx	Korea Tacoma	-
PKM 268 class (68 in class)	PKM: Patrol Killer Medium	268	Chamsuri 268	참수리 268	Gireogi 68	-	-	-	-	2014-12-30	-	-
PKM 268 class (68 in class)	PKM: Patrol Killer Medium	269	Chamsuri 269	참수리 269	Gireogi 69	-	-	-	-	2014-12-30	-	-
PKM 268 class (68 in class)	PKM: Patrol Killer Medium	273	Chamsuri 273	참수리 273	Gireogi 73	-	-	-	-	2014-12-30	-	-
PKM 268 class (68 in class)	PKM: Patrol Killer Medium	275	Chamsuri 275	참수리 275	Gireogi 75	-	-	-	-	2014-12-30	-	-
PKM 268 class (68 in class)	PKM: Patrol Killer Medium	276	Chamsuri 276	참수리 276	Gireogi 76	-	-	-	-	-	-	-
PKM 268 class (68 in class)	PKM: Patrol Killer Medium	277	Chamsuri 277	참수리 277	Gireogi 77	-	-	-	-	2014-12-30	-	Transferred to Philippine Navy in 1998 as PG 116
PKM 268 class (68 in class)	PKM: Patrol Killer Medium	278	Chamsuri 278	참수리 278	Gireogi 78	-	-	-	-	-	-	-
PKM 268 class (68 in class)	PKM: Patrol Killer Medium	279	Chamsuri 279	참수리 279	Gireogi 79	-	-	-	-	2014-12-30	-	-
PKM 268 class (68 in class)	PKM: Patrol Killer Medium	281	Chamsuri 281	참수리 281	Gireogi 81	-	-	-	-	2014-12-30	-	-
PKM 268 class (68 in class)	PKM: Patrol Killer Medium	282	Chamsuri 282	참수리 282	Gireogi 82	-	-	-	-	2014-12-30	-	-
PKM 268 class (68 in class)	PKM: Patrol Killer Medium	283	Chamsuri 283	참수리 283	Gireogi 83	-	-	-	-	2015-12-31	-	-
PKM 268 class (68 in class)	PKM: Patrol Killer Medium	285	Chamsuri 285	참수리 285	Gireogi 85	-	-	1985-08-07	-	2015-12-31	Korea Shipbuilding Corp.	Displayed at Seoul Battleship Park
PKM 268 class (68 in class)	PKM: Patrol Killer Medium	286	Chamsuri 286	참수리 286	Gireogi 86	-	-	1986-06-xx	-	2016-12-31	Korea Tacoma	-
PKM 268 class (68 in class)	PKM: Patrol Killer Medium	287	Chamsuri 287	참수리 287	Gireogi 87	-	-	1986-06-xx	-	2016-12-31	Korea Tacoma	-
PKM 268 class (68 in class)	PKM: Patrol Killer Medium	288	Chamsuri 288	참수리 288	Gireogi 88	-	-	-	-	2015-12-31	-	-
PKM 268 class (68 in class)	PKM: Patrol Killer Medium	289	Chamsuri 289	참수리 289	Gireogi 89	-	-	1986-06-xx	-	2016-12-31	Korea Tacoma	-
PKM 268 class (68 in class)	PKM: Patrol Killer Medium	291	Chamsuri 291	참수리 291	Gireogi 91	-	-	-	-	2015-12-31	-	-
PKM 268 class (68 in class)	PKM: Patrol Killer Medium	292	Chamsuri 292	참수리 292	Gireogi 92	-	-	-	1987-04-01	2017-12-29	Korea Shipbuilding Corp.	Became target ship
PKM 268 class (68 in class)	PKM: Patrol Killer Medium	293	Chamsuri 293	참수리 293	Gireogi 93	-	-	-	-	2017-12-27	-	-
PKM 268 class (68 in class)	PKM: Patrol Killer Medium	295	Chamsuri 295	참수리 295	Gireogi 95	-	-	-	-	2010-11-10	-	Sank near Jeju after collision
PKM 268 class (68 in class)	PKM: Patrol Killer Medium	296	Chamsuri 296	참수리 296	Gireogi 96	-	-	-	-	2017-12-27	-	-
PKM 268 class (68 in class)	PKM: Patrol Killer Medium	297	Chamsuri 297	참수리 297	Gireogi 97	-	-	-	-	2017-12-27	-	-
PKM 268 class (68 in class)	PKM: Patrol Killer Medium	298	Chamsuri 298	참수리 298	Gireogi 98	-	-	-	1987	2020-12-31	-	-
PKM 268 class (68 in class)	PKM: Patrol Killer Medium	299	Chamsuri 299	참수리 299	Gireogi 99	-	-	-	1987	2020-12-31	-	-
PKM 268 class (68 in class)	PKM: Patrol Killer Medium	311	Chamsuri 311	참수리 311	-	-	-	-	1987	2020-12-31	-	-
PKM 268 class (68 in class)	PKM: Patrol Killer Medium	312	Chamsuri 312	참수리 312	-	-	-	-	1987	2020-12-31	-	-
PKM 268 class (68 in class)	PKM: Patrol Killer Medium	357	Chamsuri 357	참수리 357	-	-	1992-08-28 (completion)	-	-	2002-06-29	Korea Tacoma	Sunk in the Second Battle of Yeonpyeong, later salvaged and being displayed at the Second Fleet HQ

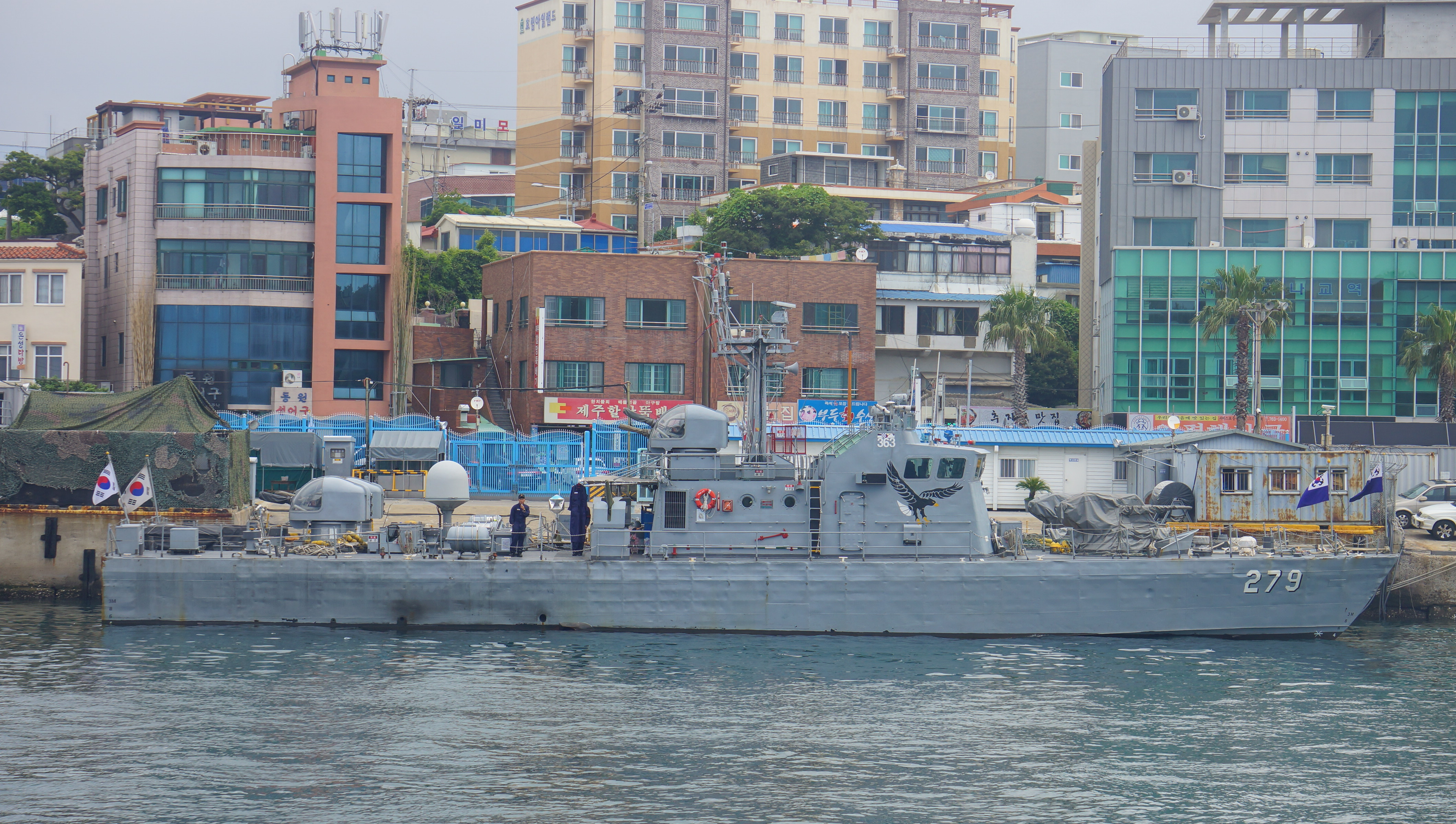
ROKS Chamsuri 279 (PKM 279)

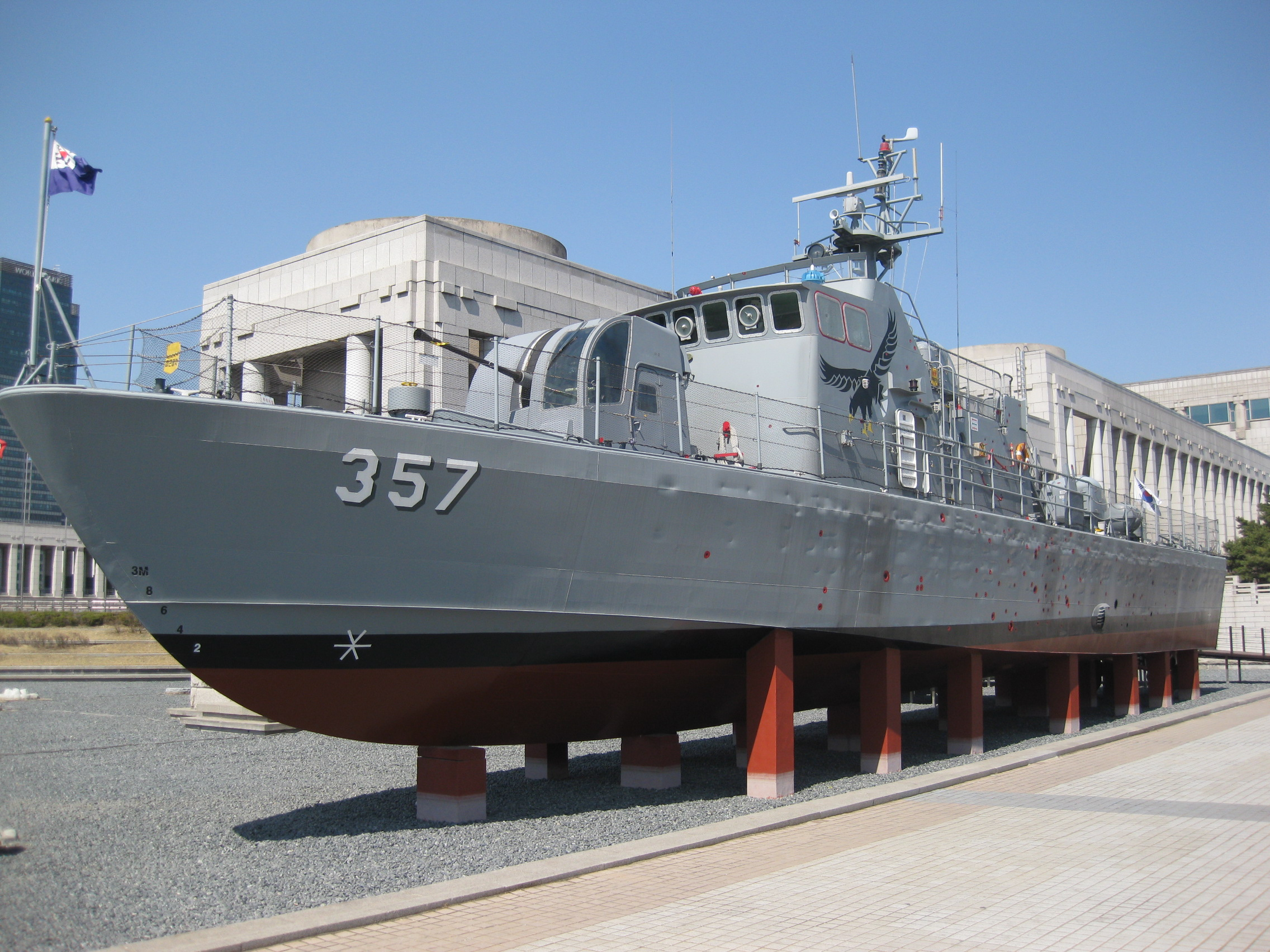
Replica of ROKS Chamsuri 357 at War Memorial of Korea

==== Jebi class and Doksuri 11 class ====
Jebi (PK) means the swallow in Korean. Doksuri (FB) means the vulture in Korean.

Class	ROKN classification	Hull number	Name (a.k.a.)	Hangul name (Hanja)	Formerly known as	Displacement (light/full, tons)	Launch date	Delivery date	Commission date	Decommission date	Builder	Note
Haksaeng class	PBK →PK: Patrol Killer	PBK 1 →PK 151 (1974)	Jebi 151 →Jebi 51	제비 51	Haksaeng 1	61/70	1972-11-18	1972-11-18	1973-01-15	1993?	Korea Shipbuilding Corp.	-
Haksaeng class	PBK →PK: Patrol Killer	PBK 2 →PK 152 (1974)	Jebi 152 →Jebi 52	제비 52	Haksaeng 2	61/70	1972-11-18	1972-11-18	1973-01-15	1993?	Korea Shipbuilding Corp.	-
PK 153 class (29 in class)	PK: Patrol Killer	153	Jebi 153 →Jebi 53	제비 53	-	70/78	-	1975-05-31	1975-06-01	1993?	Korea Tacoma	12 PKs transferred to Philippines
PK 153 class (29 in class)	PK: Patrol Killer	155	Jebi 155 →Jebi 55	제비 55	-	70/78	-	1975-05-31	1975-06-01	1993?	Korea Shipbuilding Corp.	12 PKs transferred to Philippines
PK 153 class (29 in class)	PK: Patrol Killer	156	Jebi 156 →Jebi 56	제비 56	-	70/78	-	1975-08-01	1975-08-01	1993?	Korea Shipbuilding Corp.	12 PKs transferred to Philippines
PK 153 class (29 in class)	PK: Patrol Killer	157	Jebi 157 →Jebi 57	제비 57	-	70/78	-	1975-09-15	1975-09-17	1993?	Korea Tacoma	12 PKs transferred to Philippines
PK 153 class (29 in class)	PK: Patrol Killer	158	Jebi 158 →Jebi 58	제비 58	-	70/78	-	1975-10-08	1975-10-08	1993?	Korea Shipbuilding Corp.	12 PKs transferred to Philippines
PK 153 class (29 in class)	PK: Patrol Killer	159	Jebi 159 →Jebi 59	제비 59	-	70/78	-	1975-11-01	1975-11-01	1993?	Korea Tacoma	12 PKs transferred to Philippines
PK 153 class (29 in class)	PK: Patrol Killer	160	Jebi 160 →Jebi 60	제비 60	-	70/78	-	1975-11-25	1975-11-25	1993?	Korea Tacoma	12 PKs transferred to Philippines
PK 153 class (29 in class)	PK: Patrol Killer	161	Jebi 161 →Jebi 61	제비 61	-	70/78	-	1975-11-25	1975-11-25	1993?	Korea Shipbuilding Corp.	12 PKs transferred to Philippines
PK 153 class (29 in class)	PK: Patrol Killer	162	Jebi 162 →Jebi 62	제비 62	-	70/78	-	1975-12-22	1975-12-29	1993?	Korea Tacoma	12 PKs transferred to Philippines
PK 153 class (29 in class)	PK: Patrol Killer	163	Jebi 163 →Jebi 63	제비 63	-	70/78	-	1975-12-27	1975-12-29	1993?	Korea Tacoma	12 PKs transferred to Philippines
PK 153 class (29 in class)	PK: Patrol Killer	165	Jebi 165 →Jebi 65	제비 65	-	70/78	-	1976-01-20	1976-02-11	1993?	Korea Shipbuilding Corp.	12 PKs transferred to Philippines
PK 153 class (29 in class)	PK: Patrol Killer	166	Jebi 166 →Jebi 66	제비 66	-	70/78	-	1976-01-23	1976-02-11	1993?	Korea Tacoma	12 PKs transferred to Philippines
PK 153 class (29 in class)	PK: Patrol Killer	167	Jebi 167 →Jebi 67	제비 67	-	70/78	-	1976-01-23	1976-02-11	1984-07-26	Korea Tacoma	Grounded and sank near Yeocheongdo
PK 153 class (29 in class)	PK: Patrol Killer	168	Jebi 168 →Jebi 68	제비 68	-	70/78	-	1976-02-04	1976-02-11	1993?	Korea Tacoma	12 PKs transferred to Philippines
PK 153 class (29 in class)	PK: Patrol Killer	169	Jebi 169 →Jebi 69	제비 69	-	70/78	-	1976-02-23	1976-02-11	1993?	Korea Shipbuilding Corp.	12 PKs transferred to Philippines
PK 153 class (29 in class)	PK: Patrol Killer	170	Jebi 170 →Jebi 70	제비 70	-	70/78	-	1976-02-27	1976-02-28	1993?	Korea Tacoma	12 PKs transferred to Philippines
PK 153 class (29 in class)	PK: Patrol Killer	171	Jebi 171 →Jebi 71	제비 71	-	70/78	-	1976-02-27	1976-02-28	1993?	Korea Tacoma	12 PKs transferred to Philippines
PK 153 class (29 in class)	PK: Patrol Killer	172	Jebi 172 →Jebi 72	제비 72	-	70/78	-	1976-02-20	1976-02-28	1993?	Korea Tacoma	12 PKs transferred to Philippines
PK 153 class (29 in class)	PK: Patrol Killer	173	Jebi 170 →Jebi 73	제비 73	-	70/78	-	1976-03-30	1976-04-01	1993-02-15	Korea Shipbuilding Corp.	12 PKs transferred to Philippines
PK 153 class (29 in class)	PK: Patrol Killer	175	Jebi 175 →Jebi 75	제비 75	-	70/78	-	1976-03-30	1976-04-01	1993?	Korea Shipbuilding Corp.	12 PKs transferred to Philippines
PK 153 class (29 in class)	PK: Patrol Killer	176	Jebi 176 →Jebi 76	제비 76	-	70/78	-	1977-11-18	1977-12-20	1993?	Korea Shipbuilding Corp.	12 PKs transferred to Philippines
PK 153 class (29 in class)	PK: Patrol Killer	177	Jebi 177 →Jebi 77	제비 77	-	70/78	-	1977-11-21	1977-12-20	1993?	Korea Tacoma	12 PKs transferred to Philippines
PK 153 class (29 in class)	PK: Patrol Killer	178	Jebi 178 →Jebi 78	제비 78	-	70/78	-	1977-11-18	1977-12-20	1993-02-15	Korea Shipbuilding Corp.	12 PKs transferred to Philippines
PK 153 class (29 in class)	PK: Patrol Killer	179	Jebi 179 →Jebi 79	제비 79	-	70/78	-	1977-11-28	1977-12-20	1993?	Korea Tacoma	12 PKs transferred to Philippines
PK 153 class (29 in class)	PK: Patrol Killer	180	Jebi 80	제비 80	-	70/78	-	1977-12-20	1978-01-30	1993?	Korea Shipbuilding Corp.	12 PKs transferred to Philippines
PK 153 class (29 in class)	PK: Patrol Killer	181	Jebi 81	제비 81	-	70/78	-	1978-01-31	1978-03-02	1993-02-15	Korea Tacoma	12 PKs transferred to Philippines
PK 153 class (29 in class)	PK: Patrol Killer	182	Jebi 82	제비 82	-	70/78	-	1977-12-20	1978-01-30	1993?	Korea Shipbuilding Corp.	12 PKs transferred to Philippines
PK 153 class (29 in class)	PK: Patrol Killer	183	Jebi 83	제비 83	-	70/78	-	1978-02-10	1978-03-02	1993?	Korea Tacoma	12 PKs transferred to Philippines
PK 153 class (29 in class)	PK: Patrol Killer	185	Jebi 85	제비 85	-	70/78	-	1978-03-15	1978-04-15	1991-04-08	Korea Shipbuilding Corp.	Sunk after collision
Class	ROKN classification	Hull number	Name (a.k.a.)	Hangul name (Hanja)	Formerly known as	Displacement (light/full, tons)	Launch date	Delivery date	Commission date	Decommission date	Builder	Note
FB(B) 11 class	FB(B): Fast Boat	11	Doksuri 11	독수리 11	-	30/33	-	1973-03-05	1973-11-19	1976-04-13	Korea Shipbuilding Corp.	Aluminum hull; Became service craft after decommission
FB(B) 11 class	FB(B): Fast Boat	12	Doksuri 12	독수리 12	-	30/33	-	1973-03-05	1973-11-19	1976-04-13	Korea Shipbuilding Corp.	Aluminum hull; Became service craft after decommission
FB(B) 11 class	FB(B): Fast Boat	13	Doksuri 13	독수리 13	-	30/33	-	1973-07-31	1973-11-19	1976-04-13	Korea Shipbuilding Corp.	Aluminum hull; Became service craft after decommission
FB(B) 11 class	FB(B): Fast Boat	15	Doksuri 15	독수리 15	-	30/33	-	1973-07-31	1973-11-19	1976-04-13	Korea Shipbuilding Corp.	Aluminum hull; Became service craft after decommission
FB(B) 11 class	FB(B): Fast Boat	16	Doksuri 16	독수리 16	-	30/33	-	1973-08-23	1973-11-19	1976-04-13	Korea Shipbuilding Corp.	Aluminum hull; Became service craft after decommission
FB(B) 11 class	FB(B): Fast Boat	17	Doksuri 17	독수리 17	-	30/33	-	1973-08-23	1973-11-19	1976-04-13	Korea Shipbuilding Corp.	Aluminum hull; Became service craft after decommission
FB(B) 11 class	FB(B): Fast Boat	18	Doksuri 18	독수리 18	-	30/33	-	1973-10-10	1973-11-19	1976-04-13	Korea Shipbuilding Corp.	Aluminum hull; Became service craft after decommission
FB(B) 11 class	FB(B): Fast Boat	19	Doksuri 19	독수리 19	-	30/33	-	1973-10-10	1973-11-19	1976-04-13	Korea Shipbuilding Corp.	Aluminum hull; Became service craft after decommission
FB(B) 11 class	FB(B): Fast Boat	20	Doksuri 20	독수리 20	-	30/33	-	1974-04-15	1974-04-22	1976-04-13	Korea Shipbuilding Corp.	Aluminum hull; Became service craft after decommission
FB(B) 11 class	FB(B): Fast Boat	21	Doksuri 21	독수리 21	-	30/33	-	1974-04-15	1974-04-22	1976-04-13	Korea Shipbuilding Corp.	Aluminum hull; Became service craft after decommission
FB(B) 11 class	FB(B): Fast Boat	22	Doksuri 22	독수리 22	-	30/33	-	1974-04-15	1974-05-24	1976-04-13	Korea Shipbuilding Corp.	Aluminum hull; Became service craft after decommission

=== Amphibious warfare ships ===
Solgae (LSF) means the black kite in Korean.

Class	ROKN classification	Hull number	Name (a.k.a.)	Hangul name (Hanja)	Formerly known as	Displacement (light/full, tons)	Launch date	Delivery date	Commission date	Decommission date	Builder	Note
LSF 611 class	LSF: Landing Ship Fast	611	Solgae 611	솔개 611	-	xxx/120	1989-06-09	1989-12-29	-	2005-06-30	Korea Tacoma	-

=== Auxiliary ships ===
Dadohae (ASL) means an archipelago in Korean.

Sincheonji (AGS) means a new world in Korean.

Mulgae (LCU) means the fur seal in Korean.

Class	ROKN classification	Hull number	Name (a.k.a.)	Hangul name (Hanja)	Formerly known as	Displacement (light/full, tons)	Launch date	Delivery date	Commission date	Decommission date	Builder	Note
Dadohae class	ASL: Midget-submarine Tender	50	Dadohae	다도해 (多島海)	-	2770	1992-07-10	1993-01-30	1993-03-13	2020-06-30	Korea Tacoma	-
Sincheonji class	AGS: Surveying Ship	11	Sincheonji	신천지 (新天地)	-	-	1992-07-07	-	1993-07-05	2013-12-31	-	-
LCU 72 class	LCU: Landing Craft Utility	2 →72	Mulgae 72	물개 72	-	187/370	-	1976-11-xx	1978-06-01	-	Korea Tacoma	ex-Service craft added to Fleet List on 1978-06-01
LCU 72 class	LCU: Landing Craft Utility	3 →73	Mulgae 73	물개 73	-	187/370	-	1976-11-xx	1978-06-01	-	Korea Tacoma	ex-Service craft added to Fleet List on 1978-06-01
LCU 72 class	LCU: Landing Craft Utility	5 →75	Mulgae 75	물개 75	-	187/370	-	1976-11-xx	1978-06-01	-	Korea Tacoma	ex-Service craft added to Fleet List on 1978-06-01
LCU 72 class	LCU: Landing Craft Utility	76	Mulgae 76	물개 76	-	-	-	1979?	-	-	-	-
LCU 72 class	LCU: Landing Craft Utility	77	Mulgae 77	물개 77	-	-	-	1979?	-	-	-	-
LCU 72 class	LCU: Landing Craft Utility	78	Mulgae 78	물개 78	-	-	-	1979?	-	2014?	-	Transferred to Philippines after decommission

== Ships acquired after the Korean War ==
After the Korean War, most of the ships acquired under the terms of the Security Assistance Program based on the "Agreement between the Government of the Republic of Korea and the Government of the United States of America concerning the Loan of American Vessels".

A total of 109 ships acquired: 3 DD, 9 DD (FRAM), 3 DE, 6 APD, 3 PCE/MSF, 4 PCEC, 4 PCE, 1 PCE (AGP), 3 PC, 1 PB (PT), 9 PB, 9 FB, 4 SB, 9 LST, 1 LSMR, 12 LSM, 3 MSC(O), 8 MSC, 2 ATS, 2 ARS, 2 ATA, 1 ARL, 2 AOG, 1 AO, 1 YO, 4 AKL, 1 LCU, 1 MSB

=== Destroyers ===
Destroyers (DD, DE, APD) were named after provinces and large cities, with the exceptions of Chungmu (named after Admiral Yi Sunshin), Asan (Admiral Yi's hometown), and Ungpo (named for Admiral Yi's Battle of Ungpo).

Class	ROKN classification	Hull number	Name (a.k.a.)	Hangul name (Hanja)	Formerly known as	Displacement (light/full, tons)	Launch date	Delivery date	Commission date	Decommission date	Builder	Note
Fletcher class	DD: Destroyer	91 →911^{a}	Chungmu	충무 (忠武)	USS Erben (DD-631)	2,100/3,057	1943-03-21	1963-05-16	1963-09-05	1993-03-31	Bath Iron Works	Delivered in Long Beach; 3rd ship named for Admiral Yi Sunshin after PG 313, PG 315
Fletcher class	DD: Destroyer	92 →912^{a}	Seoul	서울	USS Halsey Powell (DD-686)	2,100/3,057	1943-06-30	1968-04-27	1968-07-19	1982-01-15	Bethlehem Shipbuilding Corp.	Delivered in Long Beach; 2nd Seoul after LCI 101
Fletcher class	DD: Destroyer	93 →913^{a}	Busan (Pusan)	부산 (釜山)	USS Hickox (DD-673)	2,100/3,057	1943-07-04	1968-11-15	1969-03-25	1989-04-30	Federal Shipbuilding and Drydock Co.	Delivered in Boston; 2nd Busan after AKL 901
Gearing class (FRAM II)	DD →DDH: Destroyer Helicopter →DD	95 →915^{a}	Chungbuk	충북 (忠北)	USS Chevalier (DD-805)	2,376/3,500	1944-10-29	1972-07-30	1972-12-26	2000-06-30	Bath Iron Works	Delivered in San Diego
Gearing class (FRAM II)	DD →DDH: Destroyer Helicopter →DD	96 →916^{a}	Jeonbuk	전북 (全北)	USS Everett F. Larson (DD-830)	2,350/3,470	1945-01-28	1972-10-30	1972-12-28	1999-04-30	Federal Shipbuilding and Drydock Co.	Delivered in Long Beach; Display in Gangneung
Allen M. Sumner class (FRAM II)	DD: Destroyer	97 →917^{a}	Daegu	대구 (大邱)	USS Wallace L. Lind (DD-703)	2,408/3,262	1944-06-14	1973-12-03	1974-01-24	1994-12-30	Federal Shipbuilding and Drydock Co.	Delivered in San Diego; 2nd Daegu after JMS 303
Allen M. Sumner class (FRAM II)	DD: Destroyer	98 →918^{a}	Incheon	인천 (仁川)	USS De Haven (DD-727)	2,447/3,247	1944-01-09	1973-12-04	1974-01-24	1994-12-30	Bath Iron Works	Delivered in Long Beach; 2nd Incheon after AKL 902
Gearing class (FRAM I)	DD →DDH: Destroyer Helicopter →DD	99 →919^{a}	Daejeon (Taejon)	대전 (大田)	USS New (DD-818)	2,176/3,460	1945-08-18	1977-03-25	1977-07-01	2000-03-31	Consolidated Steel Corp.	Delivered in Philadelphia; 2nd Daejeon after JMS 301
Gearing class (FRAM I)	DD →DDH: Destroyer Helicopter →DD	90 →921^{a}	Gwangju (Kwangju)	광주 (光州)	USS Richard E. Kraus (DD-849)	2,416/3,502	1946-03-02	1977-03-25	1977-07-01	2000-12-31	Bath Iron Works	Delivered in Norfolk; 2nd Gwangju after YMS 503
Gearing class (FRAM I)	DD →DDH: Destroyer Helicopter →DD	922	Gangwon (Kangwon)	강원 (江原)	USS William R. Rush (DD-714)	2,475/3,557	1945-07-08	1978-07-01	1978-09-15	2000-12-29	Federal Shipbuilding and Drydock Co.	Delivered in New York; Donated as museum ship and scrapped; 2nd Gangwon after DE 72
Gearing class (FRAM I)	DD →DDH: Destroyer Helicopter →DD	923	Gyeonggi (Kyong Ki)	경기 (京畿)	USS Newman K. Perry (DD-883)	2,425/3,460	1945-03-17	1981-02-27	1981-05-18	1998-08-31	Consolidated Steel Corp.	Delivered in Newport; 2nd Gyeonggi after DE 71
Gearing class (FRAM I)	DD →DDH: Destroyer Helicopter →DD	925	Jeonju	전주 (全州)	USS Rogers (DD-876)	2,425/3,460	1944-11-20	1981-08-11	1981-10-14	1999-12-30	Consolidated Steel Corp.	Delivered in Seattle; Display at Sapgyo Marine Park
Cannon class	DE: Destroyer Escort	71	Gyeonggi (Kyong Ki)	경기 (京畿)	USS Muir (DE-770)	1,240/1,620	1944-06-04	1956-02-02	1956-06-23	1977-12-28	Tampa Shipbuilding Co.	Delivered in Boston
Cannon class	DE: Destroyer Escort	72	Gangwon (Kangwon)	강원 (江原)	USS Sutton (DE-771)	1,240/1,620	1944-08-06	1956-02-02	1956-06-23	1977-10-28	Tampa Shipbuilding Co.	Delivered in Boston
Rudderow class	DE: Destroyer Escort	73 →821^{a}	Chungnam	충남 (忠南)	USS Holt (DE-706)	1,450/1,673	1944-02-15	1963-06-19	1963-10-17	1984-01-31	Defoe Shipbuilding Co.	Delivered in Seattle; Detected Russian sub in 1964
Crosley class	APD: Transport Destroyer (High-speed Transport)	APD 81 →822^{a}	Gyeongnam (Kyong Nam)	경남 (慶南)	USS Cavallaro (APD-128)	1,268/2,114	1944-06-15	1959-10-15	1960-02-17	2000-12-29	Defoe Shipbuilding Co.	Delivered in Long Beach; Became target ship after decommission
Crosley class	APD: Transport Destroyer (High-speed Transport)	APD 82 →823^{a}	Asan (Ah San)	아산 (牙山)	USS Harry L. Corl (APD-108)	1,680/2,114	1944-03-01	1966-06-01	1966-08-05	1984-08-31	Bethlehem-Hingham Shipyard	Delivered in Jinhae
Rudderow class	PG →APD (1974)	PG 83 →APD 83 →825^{a}	Ungpo	웅포 (熊浦)	USS Julius A. Raven (APD-110)	1,268/2,114	1944-03-03	1966-06-01	1966-08-05	1984-08-31	Bethlehem-Hingham Shipyard	Delivered in Jinhae
Buckley class	PG →APD (1974)	PG 85 →APD 85 →826^{a}	Gyeongbuk (Kyong Puk)	경북 (慶北)	USS Kephart (DE-207/APD-61)	1,684/2,125	1943-09-06	1967-08-16	1967-11-11	1985-04-30	Charleston Navy Yard	Delivered in Jinhae
Buckley class	PG →APD (1974)	PG 86 →APD 86 →827^{a}	Jeonnam (Chun Nam)	전남 (全南)	USS Hayter (DE 212/APD 80)	1,400/2,043	1943-11-11	1967-08-16	1967-11-11	1986-10-31	Charleston Navy Yard	Delivered in Jinhae
Rudderow class	PG →APD (1974)	PG 87 →APD 87 →828^{a}	Jeju (Che Ju)	제주 (濟州)	USS William M. Hobby (APD-95)	1,650/1,820	1944-02-02	1967-08-16	1967-11-11	1986-10-31	Charleston Navy Yard	Delivered in Jinhae

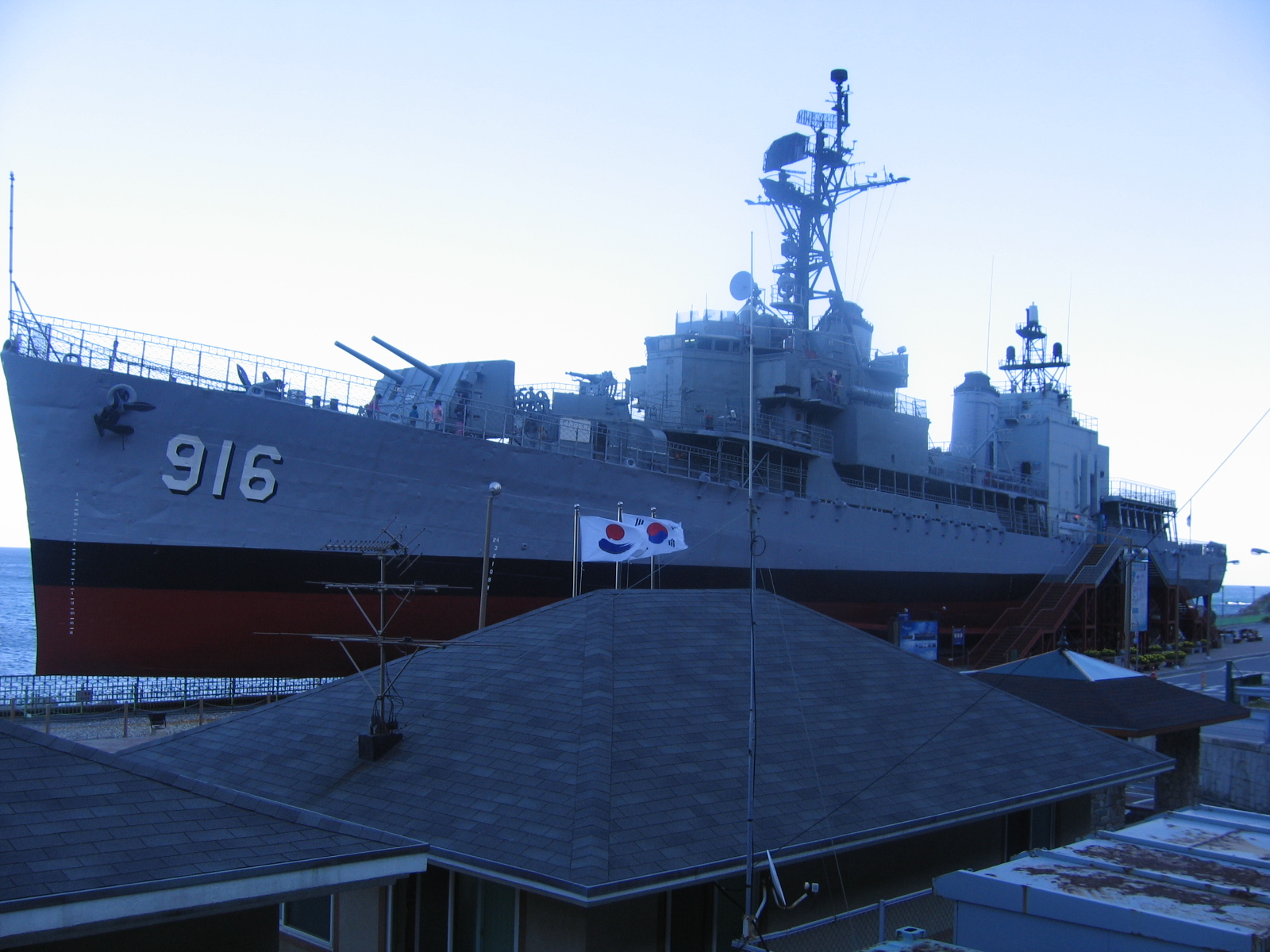
ROKS Jeonbuk (DD 916)

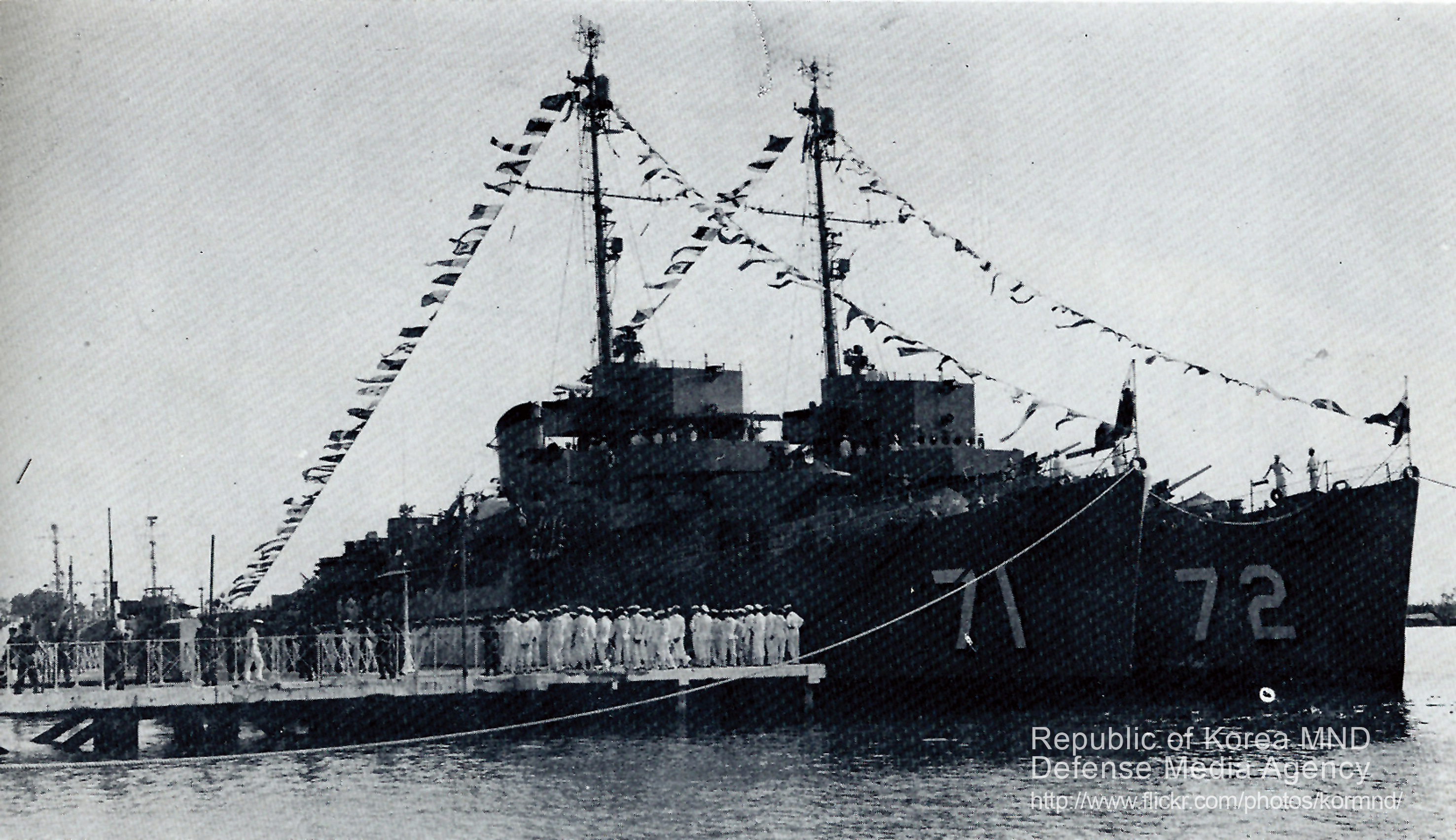
ROKS Gyeonggi (DE 71) and ROKS Gangwon (DE 72)

=== Patrol vessels ===
PCEs were named for places related with Admiral Yi Sunshin's battles, with the exception of Geojin (named for Battle of Geojin in 1960).

PCs were named for mountains.

Olppaemi (PB) means the owl. Doksuri (FB) means the vulture in Korean. Boramae (SB) means a juvenile Eurasian goshawk in Korean.

Class	ROKN classification	Hull number	Name (a.k.a.)	Hangul name (Hanja)	Formerly known as	Displacement (light/full, tons)	Launch date	Delivery date	Commission date	Decommission date	Builder	Note
Auk class	PCE: Patrol Craft Escort →PCE/MSF (1971)	1001 →711^{a}	Sinseong (Shin Song)	신성 (新城)	USS Ptarmigan (AM-376/MSF-376)	799/1,157	1944-07-15	1963-07-25	1963-12-04	1984-05-31	Savannah Machine and Foundry Co.	Delivered in Seattle
Auk class	PCE: Patrol Craft Escort →PCE/MSF (1971)	1002 →712^{a}	Suncheon (Sunchon)	순천 (順天)	USS Speed (AM-116/MSF-116)	799/1,157	1942-04-18	1967-11-17	1968-xx-xx	1984-05-31	American Ship Building Co.	Delivered in Seattle
Auk class	PCE: Patrol Craft Escort →PCE/MSF (1971)	1003 →713^{a}	Geoje (Koje)	거제 (巨濟)	USS Dextrous (AM-341/MSF-341)	799/1,157	1943-06-17	1967-12-15	1968-xx-xx	1984-05-31	Gulf Shipbuilding Corp.	Delivered in Seattle
PCE-842 class	PCEC: Patrol Craft Escort Control →PCE (1975)	51	Noryang (Ro Ryang)	노량 (露梁)	USS Asheboro (PCE-882)	650/900	1943-12-03	1955-02-11	-	1977-12-28	Albina Engine and Machine Works	Delivered in San Francisco
PCE-842 class	PCEC: Patrol Craft Escort Control →PCE (1975)	52	Myeongnyang (Myong Ryang)	명량 (鳴梁)	USS PCE-896	650/900	1943-05-22	1955-02-11	-	1977-12-28	Willamette Iron and Steel Corp.	Delivered in San Francisco
PCE-842 class	PCEC: Patrol Craft Escort Control →PCE (1975)	53	Hansan	한산 (閑山)	USS PCE-873	650/900	1943-05-05	1955-09-02	1956-03-12	1977-09-15	Albina Engine and Machine Works	Delivered in New York
PCE-842 class	PCEC: Patrol Craft Escort Control →PCE (1975)	55	Okpo	옥포 (玉浦)	USS PCE-898/PCEC-898	650/900	1943-08-03	1955-09-02	1956-03-12	1977-09-15	Willamette Iron and Steel Corp.	Delivered in New York
PCE-842 class	PCE: Patrol Craft Escort	56	Dangpo (Tang Po)	당포 (唐浦)	USS Marfa (PCE-842)	735/897	1943-11-14	1961-12-13	1962-06-26	1967-01-19	Pullman Standard Car Manufacturing Co.	Delivered in Charleston; Sunk by N. Korean coastal artillery
PCE-842 class	PCE: Patrol Craft Escort	57 →731^{a}	Byeokpa (Pyok Pa)	벽파 (碧波)	USS Dania (PCE-870)	735/897	1943-02-27	1961-12-13	1962-06-26	1979-04-30	Albina Engine and Machine Works	Delivered in Charleston
PCE-842 class	PCE: Patrol Craft Escort	58 →732^{a}	Yulpo (Ryul Po)	율포 (栗浦)	USS Somerset (PCE-892)	735/897	1943-05-01	1961-12-13	1962-06-26	1978-12-01	Willamette Iron and Steel Corp.	Delivered in Charleston
PCE-842 class	PCE: Patrol Craft Escort	59 →733^{a}	Sacheon (Sa Chon)	사천 (泗川)	USS Batesburg (PCE-903)	735/897	1943-09-06	1961-12-13	1962-06-26	1979-04-30	Willamette Iron and Steel Corp.	Delivered in Charleston
Admirable class	PCE: Patrol Craft Escort	50	Geojin (Kojin)	거진 (巨津)	USAS Report (AGP-289)	771/976	1944-08-08	1967-04-27	1967-05-02	1974-01-21	General Engineering and Dry Dock Co.	ex-US Army intelligence ship; Replaced ROKS Dangpo
PC-461 class	PC: Submarine Chaser	707	Odaesan (O Tae San) →Odae (1963)	오대산 (五臺山)	USS Winnemucca (PC-1145)	277/380	1943-10-27	1960-11-01	-	1974-01-21	Defoe Shipbuilding Co.	-
PC-461 class	PC: Submarine Chaser	708	Geumjeongsan (Kum Chong San) →Geumjeong (1963)	금정산 (金井山)	USS Grosse Pointe (PC-1546)	300/425	1944-01-30	1960-11-21	-	1974-01-21	Consolidated Shipbuilding Corp.	Delivered in Seattle
PC-461 class	PC: Submarine Chaser	709	Seoraksan →Seorak (1963)	설악산 (雪嶽山)	USS Chadron (PC-564)	320/425	1942-04-12	1964-01-24	-	1974-01-21	Consolidated Shipbuilding Corp.	Delivered at Guam
105' Aluminum Motor Torpedo Boat	PB: Patrol Boat	1	Olppaemi 1	올빼미 1	PT-812	102	1951-02-01	1967-04-27	-	1969-02-10	Philadelphia Navy Yard	ex-US Army intelligence boat; Transferred as PGM in Incheon w/ ROKS Geojin
80' Elco Motor Torpedo Boat	PB: Patrol Boat	2	Olppaemi 2	올빼미 2	ROKS Galmaegi (PT 23)	33/49	-	1967-11-01	-	1969-02-10	-	ROKS Galmaegi (PT 23) recommissioned (ex-USS PT-616)
Cape class	PB: Patrol Boat	3	Olppaemi 3	올빼미 3	USCGC Cape Rosier	78/98	-	1968-09-24	-	1977-09-15	United States Coast Guard Yard	Became service craft after decommission
Cape class	PB: Patrol Boat	5	Olppaemi 5	올빼미 5	USCGC Cape Sable	78/98	-	1968-09-24	-	1977-09-15	United States Coast Guard Yard	Became service craft after decommission
Cape class	PB: Patrol Boat	6	Olppaemi 6	올빼미 6	USCGC Cape Providence	78/98	-	1968-09-24	-	1977-09-15	United States Coast Guard Yard	Became service craft after decommission
Cape class	PB: Patrol Boat	7	Olppaemi 7	올빼미 7	USCGC Cape Florida	78/98	-	1968-11-27	-	1971-06-xx	United States Coast Guard Yard	Decommissioned due to accident
Cape class	PB: Patrol Boat	8	Olppaemi 8	올빼미 8	USCGC Cape Porpoise	78/98	-	1968-11-27	-	1977-09-15	United States Coast Guard Yard	Became service craft after decommission
Cape class	PB: Patrol Boat	9	Olppaemi 9	올빼미 9	USCGC Cape Falcon	78/98	-	1968-11-27	-	1977-09-15	United States Coast Guard Yard	Became service craft after decommission
Cape class	PB: Patrol Boat	10	Olppaemi 10	올빼미 10	USCGC Cape Trinity	78/98	-	1968-11-27	-	1977-09-15	United States Coast Guard Yard	Became service craft after decommission
Cape class	PB: Patrol Boat	11	Olppaemi 11	올빼미 11	USCGC Cape Darby	78/98	-	1969-03-21	-	1977-09-15	United States Coast Guard Yard	Became service craft after decommission
Cape class	PB: Patrol Boat	12	Olppaemi 12	올빼미 12	USCGC Cape Kiwanda	78/98	-	1969-03-21	-	1977-09-15	United States Coast Guard Yard	Became service craft after decommission
FB 1 class	FB: Fast Boat	1	Doksuri 1	독수리 1	-	30/33	-	1967-09-25	-	1976-04-13	Sewart Seacraft, Inc.	Became service craft after decommission; Scrapped on 1977-10-15
FB 1 class	FB: Fast Boat	2	Doksuri 2	독수리 2	-	30/33	-	1967-10-04	-	1976-04-13	Sewart Seacraft, Inc.	Became service craft after decommission; Scrapped on 1977-10-15
FB 1 class	FB: Fast Boat	3	Doksuri 3	독수리 3	-	30/33	-	1967-10-04	-	1976-04-13	Sewart Seacraft, Inc.	Became service craft after decommission; Scrapped on 1977-10-15
FB 1 class	FB: Fast Boat	5	Doksuri 5	독수리 5	-	30/33	-	1967-11-01	-	1976-04-13	Sewart Seacraft, Inc.	Became service craft after decommission; Scrapped on 1977-10-15
FB 1 class	FB: Fast Boat	6	Doksuri 6	독수리 6	-	30/33	-	1967-11-01	-	1976-04-13	Sewart Seacraft, Inc.	Became service craft after decommission
FB 1 class	FB: Fast Boat	7	Doksuri 7	독수리 7	-	30/33	-	1967-11-01	-	1976-04-13	Sewart Seacraft, Inc.	Became service craft after decommission; Scrapped on 1977-10-15
FB 1 class	FB: Fast Boat	8	Doksuri 8	독수리 8	-	30/33	-	1967-12-18	-	1976-04-13	Sewart Seacraft, Inc.	Became service craft after decommission; Scrapped on 1977-10-15
FB 1 class	FB: Fast Boat	9	Doksuri 9	독수리 9	-	30/33	-	1967-12-18	-	1976-04-13	Sewart Seacraft, Inc.	Became service craft after decommission; Scrapped on 1977-10-15
FB 1 class	FB: Fast Boat	10	Doksuri 10	독수리 10	-	30/33	-	1968-02-10	-	1976-04-13	Sewart Seacraft, Inc.	Became service craft after decommission; Scrapped on 1977-10-15
SB 1 class	SB	1	Boramae 1	보라매 1	F 31	9.25/11	-	1964-04-xx	1967-xx-xx	1973	Sewart Seacraft, Inc.	ex-Service craft; Became service craft after decommission
SB 1 class	SB	2	Boramae 2	보라매 2	F 32	9.25/11	-	1964-04-xx	1967-xx-xx	1973	Sewart Seacraft, Inc.	ex-Service craft; Became service craft after decommission
SB 1 class	SB	3	Boramae 3	보라매 3	F 33	9.25/11	-	1964-04-xx	1967-xx-xx	1973	Sewart Seacraft, Inc.	ex-Service craft; Became service craft after decommission
SB 1 class	SB	5	Boramae 5	보라매 5	F 35	9.25/11	-	1964-04-xx	1967-xx-xx	1973	Sewart Seacraft, Inc.	ex-Service craft; Became service craft after decommission

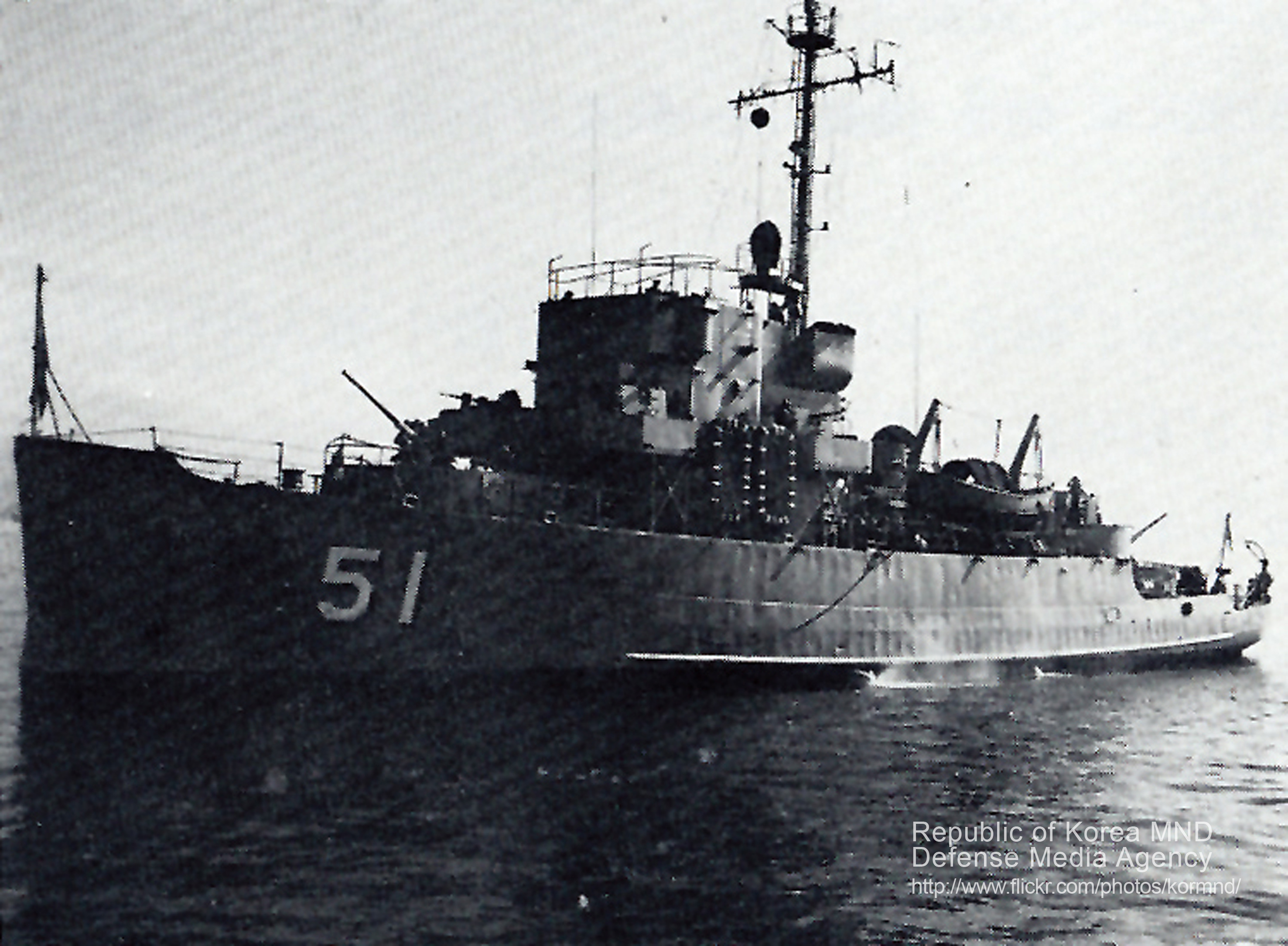
ROKS Noryang (PCEC 51)

=== Amphibious warfare ships ===
LSTs were named for mountains and mountain peaks.

LSMR was named for a town by the sea. LSMs were named for islands.

Class	ROKN classification	Hull number	Name (a.k.a.)	Hangul name (Hanja)	Formerly known as	Displacement (light/full, tons)	Launch date	Delivery date	Commission date	Decommission date	Builder	Note
LST-542 class	LST: Landing Ship Tank	807 →671^{a}	Unbong (Un Pong)	운봉 (雲峰)	USS LST-1010	1,653/4,080	1944-03-29	1955-03-22	-	2006-12-31	Bethlehem Steel Co.	Delivered in San Diego; Display at Gimpo Marine Park
LST-1 class	LST: Landing Ship Tank	808 →672^{a}	Deokbong (Dukbong)	덕봉 (德峰)	USS LST-227	1,653/4,080	1943-09-21	1955-03-29	1955-09-13	1989-10-31	Chicago Bridge and Iron Co.	-
LST-1 class	LST: Landing Ship Tank	809 →673^{a}	Bibong	비봉 (飛鳳)	USS LST-218	1,653/4,080	1943-07-20	1955-05-03	1955-09-13	1997-03-31	Chicago Bridge and Iron Co.	-
LST-1 class	LST: Landing Ship Tank	810 →675^{a}	Gyebong (Kaebong)	계봉 (鷄峰)	USS Berkshire County (LST-288)	1,653/4,080	1943-11-07	1956-03-05	1956-03-05	1999-08-31	American Bridge Co.	-
LST-1 class	LST: Landing Ship Tank	811	Jangsu	장수 (將帥)	USS LST-53/APL-59)	1,653/4,080	1943-11-06	1955-05-11	-	1959-04-18	Dravo Corp.	-
LST-542 class	LST: Landing Ship Tank	812 →676^{a}	Wibong (Weebong)	위봉 (威鳳)	USS Johnson County (LST-849)	1,653/4,080	1945-01-16	1959-01-13	1959-05-19	2006-12-31	American Bridge Co.	Delivered in Seattle; Donated as museum ship in Gunsan
LST-542 class	LST: Landing Ship Tank	813 →677^{a}	Suyeong (Su Yong)	수영 (水營)	USS Kane County (LST-853)	1,653/4,080	1944-11-19	1958-12-22	1958-12-22	2005-12-31	Chicago Bridge & Iron Co.	Donated as museum ship in Goseong
LST-542 class	LST: Landing Ship Tank	815 →678^{a}	Bukhan	북한 (北漢)	USS Linn County (LST-900)	1,653/4,080	1944-12-28	1958-12-02	1958-12-02	2005-12-31	Dravo Corp.	Delivered in San Francisco
LST-542 class	LST: Landing Ship Tank	816 →679^{a}	Hwasan	화산 (華山)	USS Pender County (LST-1080)	1,653/4,080	1945-05-02	1958-10-30	1959-03-01	1999-11-30	Bethlehem-Hingham Shipyard, Inc.	Delivered in Long Beach; Display at Sapgyo Marine Park
LSM(R)-501 class	LSMR: Landing Ship Medium Rocket	311 →650^{a}	Siheung (Si Hung)	시흥 (始興)	USS St. Joseph River (LSM(R)-527)	1,040/1,197	1945-05-19	1960-09-15	1961-01-21	1982-05-31	Brown Shipbuilding Co.	Delivered in San Diego
LSM-1 class	LSM: Landing Ship Medium	601 →651^{a}	Daecho	대초 (大草)	USS LSM-546	513/912	1945-08-25	1955-02-16	1955-02-16	1989-05-31	Brown Shipbuilding Co.	Delivered in Jinhae
LSM-1 class	LSM: Landing Ship Medium	602 →652^{a}	Yeodo	여도 (麗島)	USS LSM-268	513/912	1944-05-12	1955-02-16	1955-02-16	1993-10-30	Federal Shipbuilding and Dry Dock Co.	Delivered in Jinhae
LSM-1 class	LSM: Landing Ship Medium	603	Dokdo	독도 (獨島)	USS LSM-419	513/912	1944-11-18	1955-02-16	1955-02-16	1963-02-26	Dravo Corp.	Delivered in Jinhae; Grounded and damaged beyond repair
LSM-1 class	LSM: Landing Ship Medium	605 →653^{a}	Gadeok	가덕 (加德)	USS LSM-462	513/912	1945-02-03	1955-02-16	1955-02-16	1997-03-31	Brown Shipbuilding Co.	Delivered in Jinhae
LSM-1 class	LSM: Landing Ship Medium	606 →655^{a}	Geomun (Ku Moon)	거문 (巨文)	USS LSM-30	513/912	1944-05-28	1956-04-03	1956-08-23	1997-05-31	Brown Shipbuilding Co.	Delivered in Seattle
LSM-1 class	LSM: Landing Ship Medium	607 →656^{a}	Bian	비안 (飛雁)	USS LSM-96	513/912	1944-10-07	1956-04-03	1956-08-23	1997-03-31	Brown Shipbuilding Co.	Delivered in Seattle
LSM-1 class	LSM: Landing Ship Medium	608 →LSML 608	Pungdo	풍도 (豊島)	USS LSM-54	513/912	1944-07-14	1956-05-03	-	1984-02-29	Brown Shipbuilding Co.	Delivered in Seattle; Became minelayer LSML 608 in 1977
LSM-1 class	LSM: Landing Ship Medium	609 →657^{a}	Wolmi	월미 (月尾)	USS LSM-57	513/912	1944-07-21	1956-05-03	-	1999-02-28	Brown Shipbuilding Co.	Delivered in Seattle
LSM-1 class	LSM: Landing Ship Medium	610 →658^{a}	Girin	기린 (麒麟)	USS LSM-19	513/912	1944-05-14	1956-07-03	-	1999-02-28	Brown Shipbuilding Co.	-
LSM-1 class	LSM: Landing Ship Medium	611 →659^{a}	Neongna	능라 (綾羅)	USS LSM-84	513/912	1944-05-14	1956-07-03	1956-07-03	1998-02-28	Brown Shipbuilding Co.	-
LSM-1 class	LSM: Landing Ship Medium	612 →661^{a}	Sinmi	신미 (身彌)	USS LSM-316	513/912	1944-06-18	1956-10-18	1956-10-18	1998-02-28	Pullman Standard Car Manufacturing Co.	Delivered in Jinhae
LSM-1 class	LSM: Landing Ship Medium	613 →662^{a} →LSML 550	Ulleung	울릉 (鬱陵)	USS LSM-17	513/912	1944-05-07	1956-10-18	1956-10-18	1997-12-31	Brown Shipbuilding Co.	Became minelayer LSML 550 on 1984-02-29

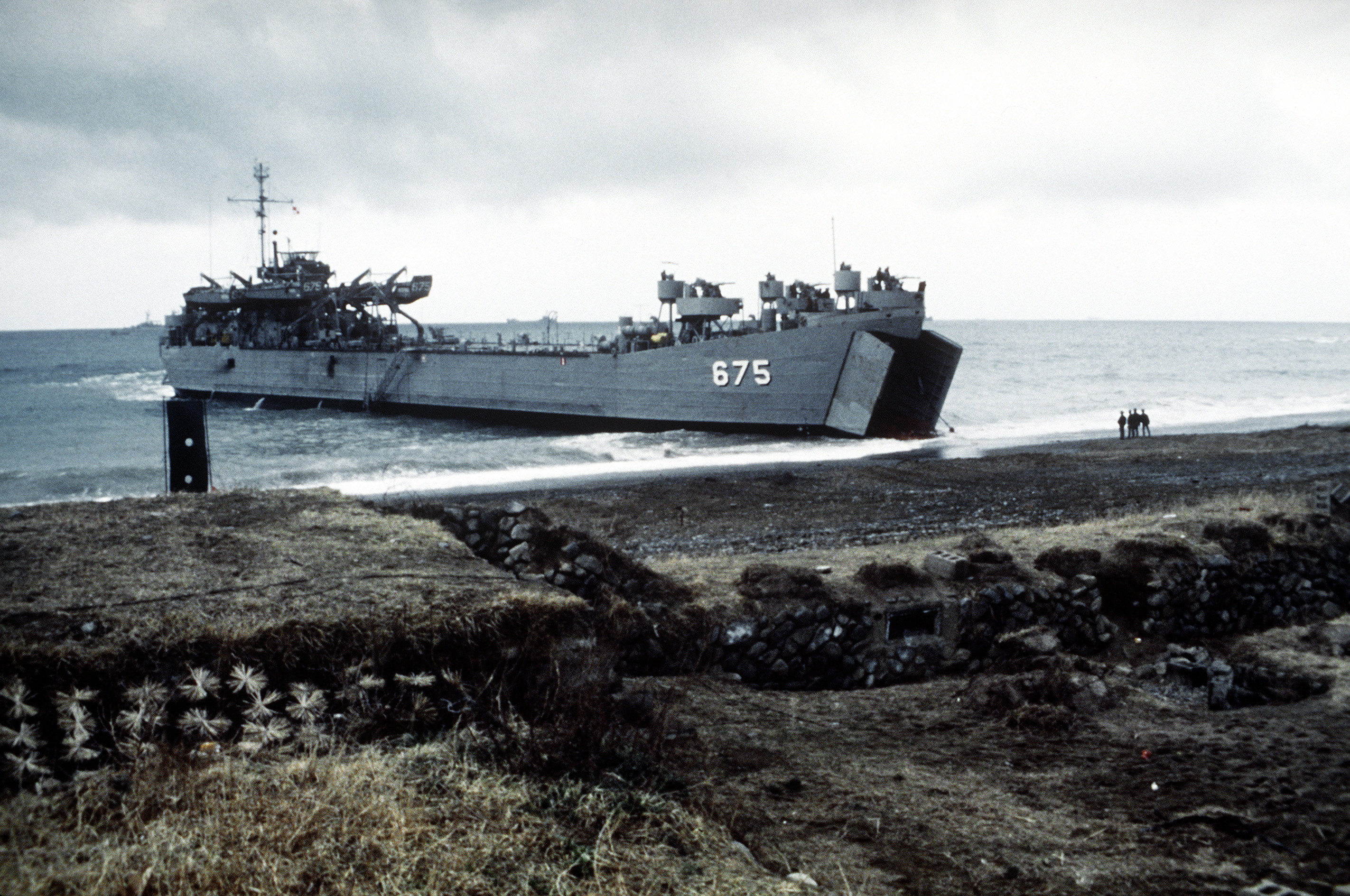
ROKS Gyebong (LST 675)

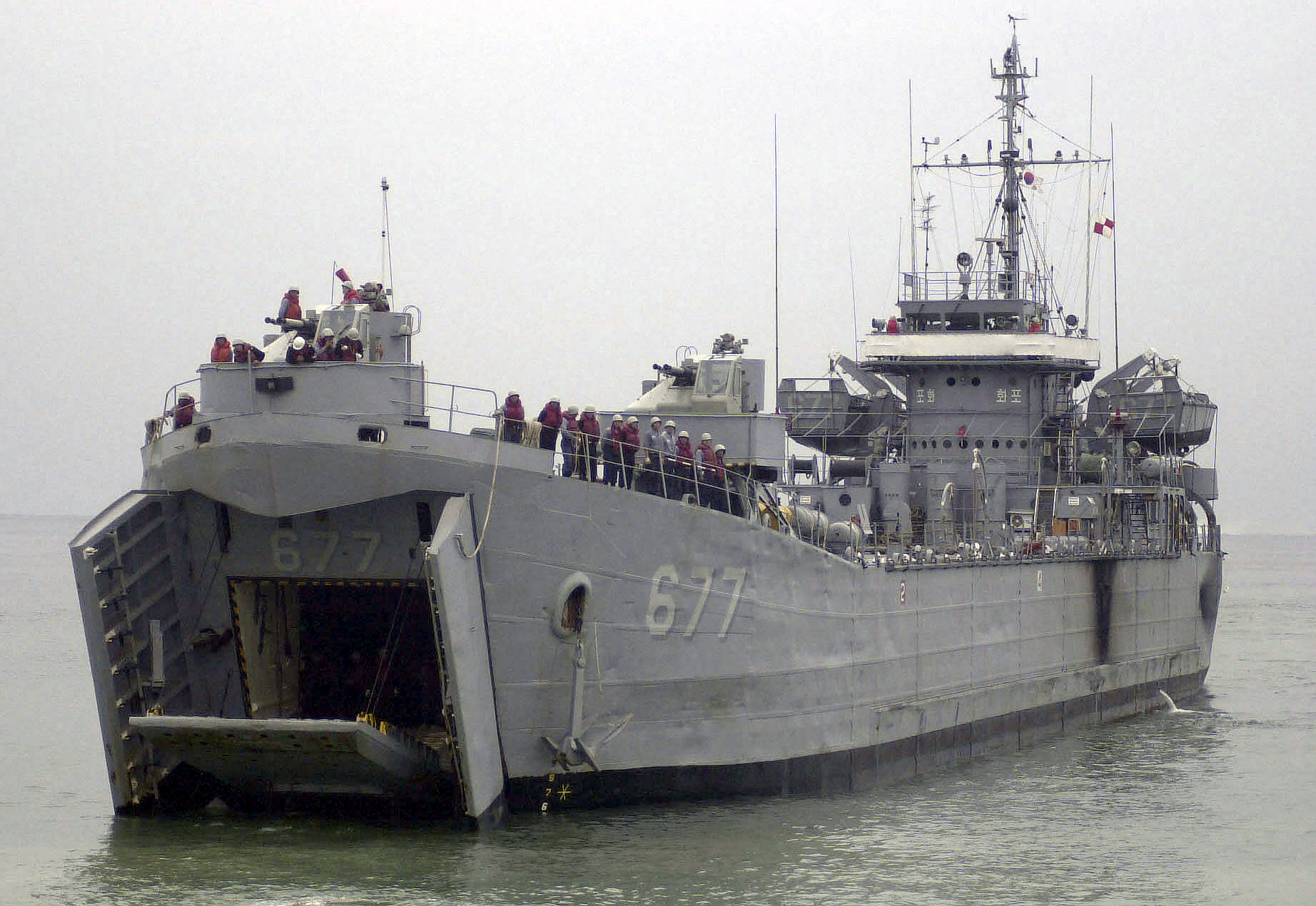
ROKS Suyeong (LST 677)

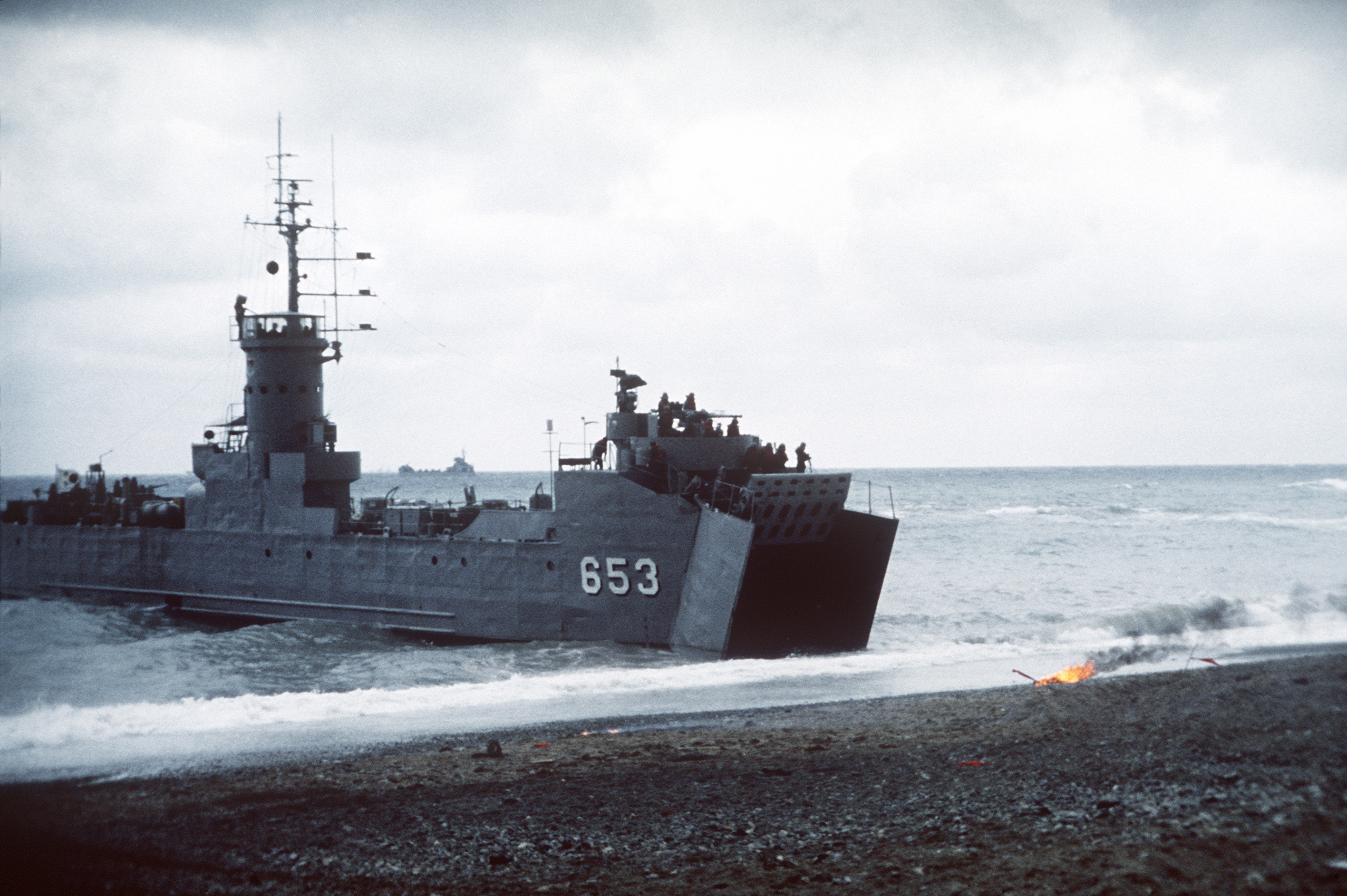
ROKS Gadeok (LSM 653)

=== Mine warfare ships ===
Minesweepers (MSC) were named for towns.

Class	ROKN classification	Hull number	Name (a.k.a.)	Hangul name (Hanja)	Formerly known as	Displacement (light/full, tons)	Launch date	Delivery date	Commission date	Decommission date	Builder	Note
YMS-1 class	AMS →MSC(O): Minesweeper Coastal (Old)	519	Geumhwa	금화 (金化)	USS Curlew (MSC(O)-8)/AMS-8/YMS-218	270/350	1942-12-23	1956-01-04	1956-01-06	1975-09-15	J. N. Martinac Shipbuilding Co.	Delivered in Jinhae
YMS-1 class	AMS →MSC(O): Minesweeper Coastal (Old)	520	Gimpo	김포 (金浦)	USS Kite (MSC(O)-22)/AMS-22/YMS-374	270/350	1944-02-17	1956-01-04	1956-01-06	1977-09-15	Weaver Shipyards	Delivered in Jinhae
YMS-1 class	AMS →MSC(O): Minesweeper Coastal (Old)	521	Gochang	고창 (高敞)	USS Mockingbird (MSC(O)-27)/AMS-27/YMS-419	270/350	1944-03-23	1956-01-04	1956-01-06	1977-09-15	Henry C. Grebe & Co.	Delivered in Jinhae
MSC-268 class	MSC: Minesweeper Coastal	522 →551^{a}	Geumsan	금산 (錦山)	MSC-284	329/378	1959-06-12 (completion)	1959-06-23	1959-11-06	1999-12-30	Harbor Boat Building Co.	Delivered in Long Beach
MSC-268 class	MSC: Minesweeper Coastal	523 →552^{a}	Goheung	고흥 (高興)	MSC-285	329/378	1959-08-14 (completion)	1959-09-10	1960-02-13	2000-12-30	Harbor Boat Building Co.	Delivered in Long Beach
MSC-268 class	MSC: Minesweeper Coastal	525 →553^{a}	Geumgok	금곡 (金谷)	MSC-286	329/378	1959-08-30 (completion)	1959-11-10	1960-04-21	2001-03-31	Harbor Boat Building Co.	Delivered in Long Beach
MSC-294 class	MSC: Minesweeper Coastal	526 →555^{a}	Namyang	남양 (南陽)	MSC-295	312/378	1963-08-13 (completion)	1963-09-07	-	2003-07-31	Peterson Builders, Inc.	Delivered in Boston
MSC-294 class	MSC: Minesweeper Coastal	527 →556^{a}	Hadong	하동 (河東)	MSC-296	312/378	1963-10-14 (completion)	1963-11-06	-	2003-12-31	Peterson Builders, Inc.	Delivered in Boston
MSC-294 class	MSC: Minesweeper Coastal	528 →557^{a}	Samcheok	삼척 (三陟)	MSC-316	312/378	1968-06-20 (completion)	1968-07-12	1969-02-15	2002-04-30	Peterson Builders, Inc.	Delivered in Boston
MSC-294 class	MSC: Minesweeper Coastal	529 →558^{a}	Yeongdong	영동 (永同)	MSC-320	335/378	1975-09-01 (completion)	1975-10-02	1976-03-10	2003-12-31	Harbor Boat Building Co.	Delivered in Philadelphia
MSC-294 class	MSC: Minesweeper Coastal	530 →559^{a}	Okcheon	옥천 (沃川)	MSC-321	335/378	1975-09-01 (completion)	1975-10-02	1976-03-10	2003-12-31	Harbor Boat Building Co.	Delivered in Philadelphia

=== Auxiliary ships ===
ATSs and ARSs were named for cities with an industrial complex. ATAs were named for mountains near Seoul. ARL was named for a town.

AOGs and AOs were named for lakes, with the exception of Baegyeon.

AKLs were named for port towns and later for bays (Cheonsu, Gwangyang, Yeongil).

Mulgae (LCU) means the fur seal in Korean.

Class	ROKN classification	Hull number	Name (a.k.a.)	Hangul name (Hanja)	Formerly known as	Displacement (light/full, tons)	Launch date	Delivery date	Commission date	Decommission date	Builder	Note
Edenton class	ATS: Salvage and Rescue Ship	27	Pyeongtaek	평택 (平澤)	USS Beaufort (ATS-2)	2,600/3,500	1968-12-01	1997-02-20	1997-04-02	2016-12-31	Brooks Marinei	-
Edenton class	ATS: Salvage and Rescue Ship	28	Gwangyang (Kwang Yang)	광양 (光陽)	USS Brunswick (ATS-3)	2,600/3,500	1969-10-14	1997-02-20	1997-04-02	2015-03-31	Brooks Marinei	Scrapped; 2nd Gwangyang after AKL 62
Diver class	ARS: Salvage Ship	25	Changwon	창원 (昌原)	USS Grasp (ARS-24)	1,682/1,940	1943-04-27	1978-03-01	1978-09-15	1996-10-31	Basalt Rock Co.	Delivered in Hawaii
Diver class	ARS: Salvage Ship	26	Gumi	구미 (龜尾)	USS Deliver (ARS-23)	1,720/2,000	1943-09-25	1980-09-19	-	1998-01-31	Basalt Rock Co.	-
Maricopa class	ATA: Ocean Tug	2 →31^{a}	Yongmun	용문 (龍門)	USS Keosanqua (ATA-198)	534/835	1943-03-19	1962-02-01	1962-05-25	1997-02-28	Levingston Shipbuilding Co.	Delivered in San Diego
Sotoyomo class	ATA: Ocean Tug	3 →32^{a}	Dobong	도봉 (道峰)	USS Pinola (ATA-206)	534/835	1945-02-10	1962-02-02	1962-05-25	1996-10-31	Gulfport Shipbuilding Corp.	Delivered in Long Beach
Achelous class	ARL: Repair Ship	1	Deoksu	덕수 (德壽)	USS Minotaur (ARL-15)	2,366/4,100	1944-09-30	1955-10-03	1956-03-12	1983-04-30	Chicago Bridge & Iron Co.	Delivered in New York; aka R 1
Rincon class	AOG: Gasoline Tanker	55	Soyang	소양 (昭陽)	USNS Rincon (T-AOG-77)	2,100/6,047	1945-06-05	1982-02-01	-	1998-10-23	Todd Shipbuilding	-
Rincon class	AOG: Gasoline Tanker	56	Jinyang	진양 (晋陽)	USNS Petaluma (T-AOG-79)	2,100/6,047	1945-08-09	1982-02-02	-	1997-08-29	Todd Shipbuilding	-
-	AO: Oiler	7 →53^{a}	Cheongpyeong	청평 (淸平)		1,800/5,400	-	1971-xx-xx	-	1997?	-	Japanese tanker
YO-55 class	YO 5 →AO 5 (1956) →YO 5 (1963) →AO 5 (1973) →AO 52^{a}	5 →52^{a}	Baegyeon → Hwacheon (1963)	백연 (白淵) → 화천 (華川)	USS Derrick (YO-59)	893/2,689	-	1955-10-05	1955-10-14	1980-07-30	RTC Shipbuilding Co.	Commissioned as USS Derrick on 1943-02-02
U.S. Army FS Design 381	AKL: Light Cargo Ship	907	Mokpo	목포 (木浦)	FS-397/USCGC Trillium (WAK-170)	460/958	-	1956-03-02	-	1978-04-01	Ingalls Shipbuilding Corp.	Delivered in Treasure Island; Became intelligence ship after decommission
Camano class	AKL: Light Cargo Ship	908 →61^{a}	Gunsan → Cheonsu (1980)	군산 (群山) → 천수 (淺水)	USS Sharps (AG-139/AKL-10)	460/958	-	1956-04-03	1956-08-23	1981-12-20	Ingalls Shipbuilding Corp.	Commissioned as USS Sharps on 1947-08-03; Delivered in Seattle
Camano class	AKL: Light Cargo Ship	909 →62^{a}	Masan → Gwangyang (1980)	마산 (馬山) → 광양 (光陽)	FS-383/T-AKL-35	460/958	-	1956-09-05	-	1980-07-31	Ingalls Shipbuilding Corp.	Delivered to the US Army in 1944; Delivered in Seattle
Camano class	AKL: Light Cargo Ship	910 →63^{a}	Ulsan → Yeongil (1980)	울산 (蔚山) → 영일 (迎日)	USS Brule (AKL-28)	460/958	1943-12-xx (laid down)	1971-11-01	1971-11-01	1982-05-31	Sturgeon Bay Shipbuilding Co.	2nd Yeongil after LSSL 110
LCT Mk6	LCU: Landing Craft Utility	1 →71^{a}	Mulgae 71	물개 71	LCT(6)-531	143/309	1943-09-05	1960-12-xx	1969-xx-xx	1973	Bison Shipbuilding Corp.	ex-Service craft added to Fleet List on 1978-06-01
-	MSB: Minesweeping Boat	1	MSB 1	-	MSB-2	30/42	1946	1962-04-xx	1969-xx-xx	1973	Norfolk Naval Shipyard	Became service craft

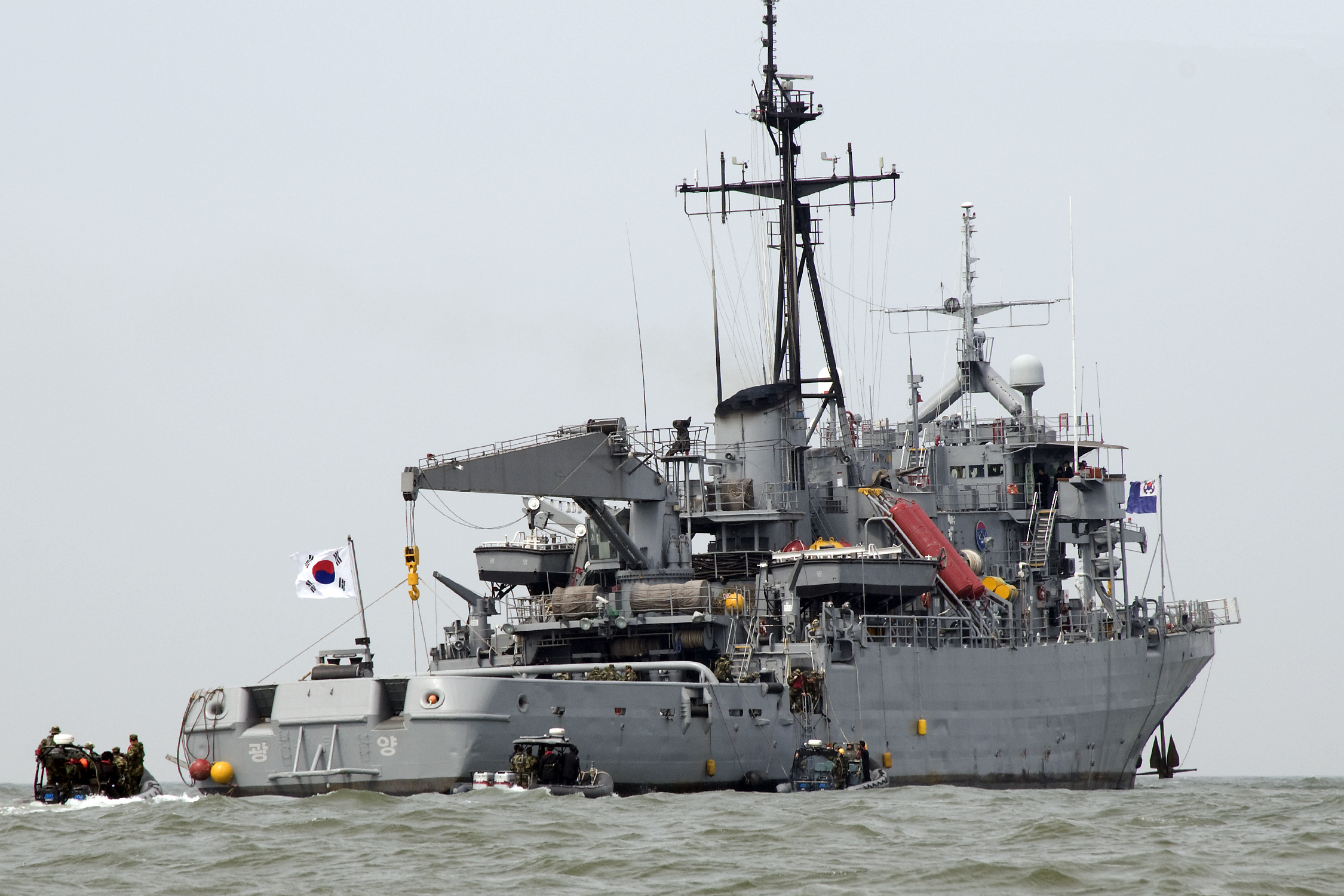
ROKS Gwangyang (ATS 28)

== Ships acquired before and during the Korean War ==
The Republic of Korea Navy was established as the Marine Defense Group on November 11, 1945. In June 1946, the Marine Defense Group became the Korean Coast Guard, and officially recognized by the United States Army Military Government in Korea. The Korean Coast Guard acquired 36 patrol craft (mainly ex-IJN and USN minecraft) through the Military Government. In October 1949, the ROK Navy purchased a 600-ton submarine chaser, the former USS PC-823, which was renamed as ROKS Baekdusan (PC 701) and became "the first significant warship of the newly independent nation". The Navy purchased three additional PC-461-class submarine chasers before the Korean War, which began on 25 June 1950 when North Korea invaded South Korea.

A total of 76 ships acquired: 5 PF, 6 PC, 4 PCS, 4 PT, 2 GB, 2 PG, 5 LST, 4 LSSL, 6 LCI, 18 YMS, 11 JMS, 5 AKL, 2 AO, 1 YO, 1 LT

=== Frigates ===
Frigates (PF) were named for rivers.

Class	ROKN classification	Hull number	Name (a.k.a.)	Hangul name (Hanja)	Formerly known as	Displacement (light/full, tons)	Launch date	Delivery date	Commission date	Decommission date	Builder	Note
Tacoma class	PF: Patrol Frigate	61	Dumangang →Duman (1959)	두만강 (豆滿江)	USS Muskogee (PF-49)	1,250/2,420	1943-10-18	1950-10-23	1950-11-05	1972-08-24	Consolidated Steel Corp.	2nd Dumangang after JMS 305
Tacoma class	PF: Patrol Frigate	62	Amnokgang →Amnok (1959)	압록강 (鴨綠江)	USS Rockford (PF-48)	1,250/2,420	1943-09-27	1950-10-23	1950-11-05	1952-05-21	Consolidated Steel Corp.	Damaged beyond repair after collision w/ Rainer
Tacoma class	PF: Patrol Frigate	63	Daedonggang →Daedong (1959)	대동강 (大同江)	USS Tacoma (PF-3)	1,250/2,420	1943-07-07	1951-10-08	1951-10-08	1973-02-28	Permanente Metals	2nd Daedonggang after JMS 309
Tacoma class	PF: Patrol Frigate	65	Nakdonggang →Nakdong (1959)	낙동강 (洛東江)	USS Hoquiam (PF-5)	1,250/2,420	1943-07-31	1951-10-08	1951-10-08	1972-05-06	Permanente Metals	-
Tacoma class	PF: Patrol Frigate	66	Imjingang →Imjin (1959)	임진강 (臨津江)	USS Sausalito (PF-4)	1,250/2,420	1943-07-20	1952-09-02	1952-11-15	1972-07-19	Permanente Metals	-

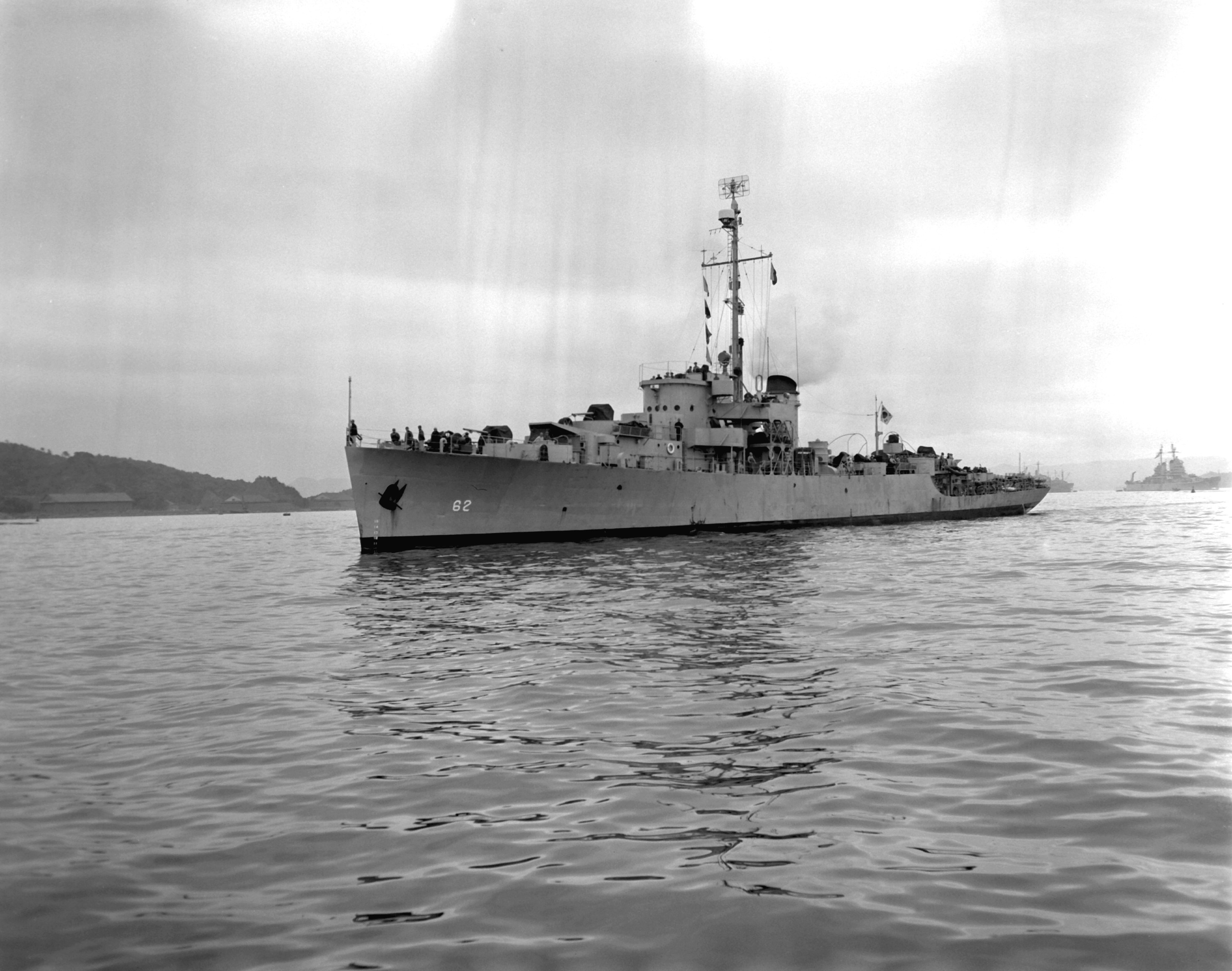
ROKS Amnokgang (PF 62)

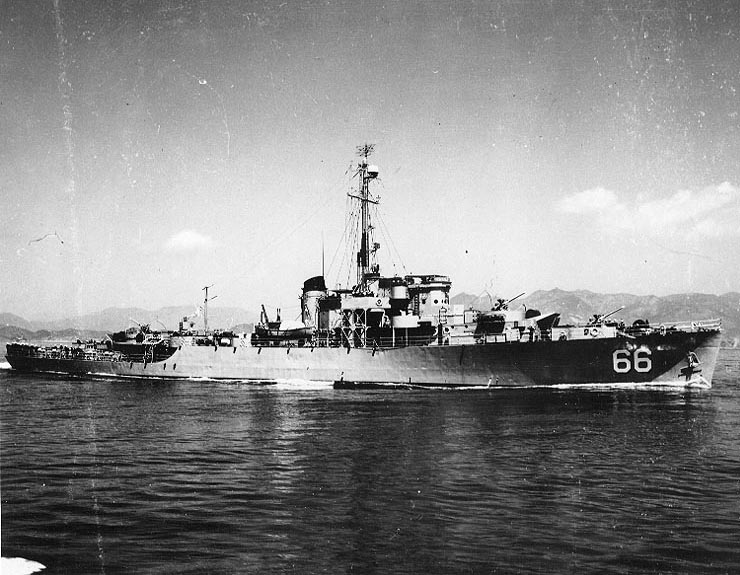
ROKS Imjingang (PF 66)

=== Patrol vessels ===
PCs were named for mountains. PCSs were named for planets. PTs were named for birds.

Chungmugong class (PG) was named after Admiral Yi Sunshin.

Class	ROKN classification	Hull number	Name (a.k.a.)	Hangul name (Hanja)	Formerly known as	Displacement (light/full, tons)	Launch date	Delivery date	Commission date	Decommission date	Builder	Note
PC-461 class	PC: Submarine Chaser	701	Baekdusan (Pak Tu San)	백두산 (白頭山)	USS PC-823/Ensign Whitehead	300/450	1944-01-15	1949-10-17	1949-12-26	1959-07-01	Leathem D. Smith Shipbuilding Corp.	Hull number assigned on 1950-04-20; Became reserve ship
PC-461 class	PC: Submarine Chaser	702	Geumgangsan (Kumkangsan)	금강산 (金剛山)	USS PC-799	300/450	1943-08-14	1950-04-08	1950-05-27	1959-07-01	Consolidated Iron Works	Became reserve ship; 2nd Geumgangsan after YMS 501
PC-461 class	PC: Submarine Chaser	703	Samgaksan (Sam Kak San)	삼각산 (三角山)	USS PC-802	300/450	1943-09-25	1950-04-08	1950-05-27	1959-07-01	Commercial Iron Works	Became reserve ship
PC-461 class	PC: Submarine Chaser	704	Jirisan (Chiri San)	지리산 (智異山)	USS PC-810	300/450	1943-12-11	1950-04-08	1950-05-27	1951-12-26	Commercial Iron Works	Struck a mine and sank, resulting in death of all sailors aboard
PC-461 class	PC: Submarine Chaser	705	Hallasan	한라산 (漢拏山)	USS PC-485	300/450	1941-12-20	1952-01-21	1952-05-03	1963-12-27	Consolidated Shipbuilding Corp.	Delivered in Astoria; Sank near Guam due to typhoon on 1962-11-11; Returned to US on 1963-12-27
PC-461 class	PC: Submarine Chaser	706	Myohyangsan →Myohyang (1963)	묘향산 (妙香山)	USS PC-600	300/450	1942-05-09	1952-01-21	1952-05-03	1968-11-01	Consolidated Shipbuilding Corp.	Delivered in Astoria
PCS-1376 class	PCS: Patrol Craft Sweeper	201	Suseong	수성 (水星)	USS PCS-1426	260/340	1943-08-31	1952-05-20	1952-08-31	1963-06-29	C. Hiltebrant Dry Dock Co.	Delivered in San Diego
PCS-1376 class	PCS: Patrol Craft Sweeper	202	Geumseong	금성 (金星)	USS PCS-1445	260/340	1943-06-19	1952-05-20	1952-08-31	1968-11-01	San Diego Marine Construction Co.	Delivered in San Diego
PCS-1376 class	PCS: Patrol Craft Sweeper	203	Mokseong	목성 (木星)	USS PCS-1446	260/340	1943-07-31	1952-05-26	1952-08-31	1967-09-21	San Diego Marine Construction Co.	Delivered in San Diego
YMS-1 class	PCS: Patrol Craft Sweeper	205	Hwaseong	화성 (火星)	USS PCS-1448	260/340	1944-06-14	1952-06-09	1952-08-31	1967-09-21	San Diego Marine Construction Co.,	Delivered in San Diego
80' Elco Motor Torpedo Boat	PT: Motor Torpedo Boat	23	Galmaegi	갈매기	USS PT-616	33/49	1945-07-24	1952-01-24	1952-02-07	1964-07-01	Elco Works	-
80' Elco Motor Torpedo Boat	PT: Motor Torpedo Boat	25	Gireogi	기러기	USS PT-619	33/49	1945-08-10	1952-01-24	1952-02-07	1963-12-30	Elco Works	Recommissioned as Olppaemi 2 in Apr 1967
80' Elco Motor Torpedo Boat	PT: Motor Torpedo Boat	26	Olppaemi	올빼미	USS PT-613	33/49	1945-05-15	1952-01-24	1952-02-07	1952-09-18	Elco Works	Burnt down during repair
80' Elco Motor Torpedo Boat	PT: Motor Torpedo Boat	27	Jebi	제비	USS PT-620	33/49	1945-08-17	1952-01-24	1952-02-07	1963-06-30	Elco Works	-
-	GB: Gunboat	21	Pongnoe	폭뢰 (爆雷)	-	-	-	-	1949-12-01	1951-xx-xx	-	Became service craft
-	GB: Gunboat	22	Heukjohwan	흑조환 (黑潮丸)	Kuroshiomaru (黒潮丸)	93	-	1950-03-26	1950-04-08	1956-03-15	-	ex-Korea colonial gov't craft delivered in Yokohama; Became service craft YAG 5
Chungmugong class	PG: Patrol Gunboat	313	Chungmugong 1	충무공 (忠武公)	-	230/300	-	-	1947-02-07	1956-03-15	Naval Ship Yard	Based on IJN service craft; Became service craft YAG 6
Chungmugong class	PG: Patrol Gunboat	315	Chungmugong 2	충무공 (忠武公)	-	230/300	-	-	1951-08-31	1956-03-15	Naval Ship Yard	Became service craft YAG 7; 2nd ship named for Admiral Yi Sunshin after PG 313

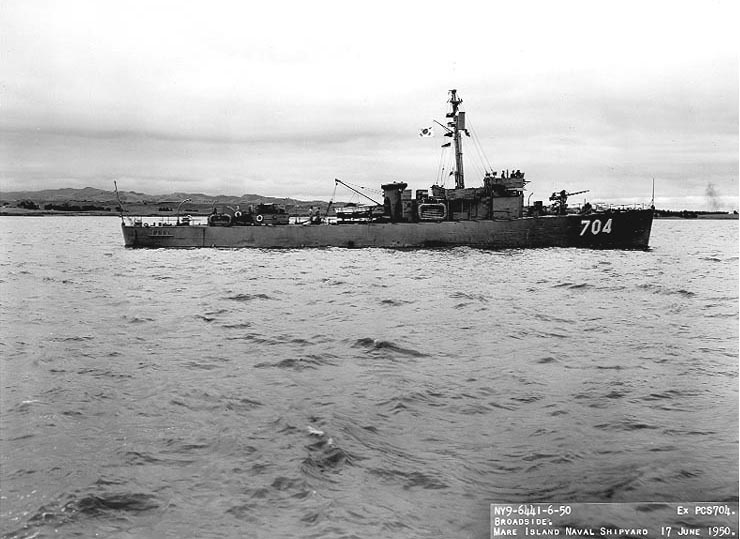
ROKS Jirisan (PC 704)

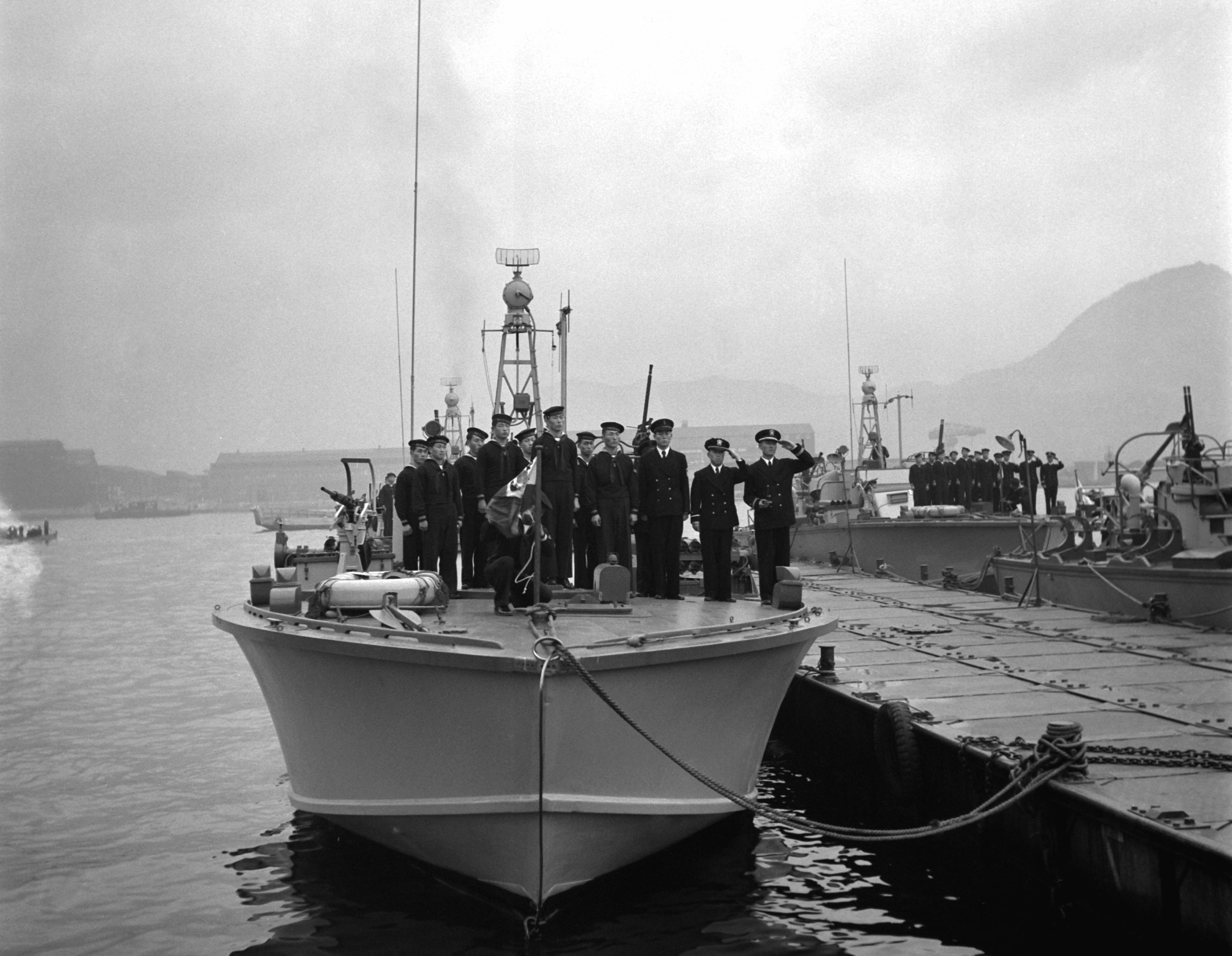
ROK Navy personnel acquiring PT boats in 1952

=== Amphibious warfare ships ===
LSTs were named for mountains, with the exception of Andong. LSSLs were named for bays. LCIs were named for cities.

Class	ROKN classification	Hull number	Name (a.k.a.)	Hangul name (Hanja)	Formerly known as	Displacement (light/full, tons)	Launch date	Delivery date	Commission date	Decommission date	Builder	Note
LST-542 class	LST: Landing Ship Tank	701 →801	Cheonan →Yonghwa	천안 (天安) →용화 (龍華)	USS LST-659	1,625/4,080	1944-03-20	1949-07-01	1949-07-01	1959-04-15	American Bridge Co.	Acquired from Korea Shipping Corp. (대한해운공사); Hull number changed on 1950-04-20; Name changed on 1951-07-17; 2nd Cheonan after LCI 101
LST-542 class	LST: Landing Ship Tank	802	Cheolong	철옹 (鐵瓮)	USS LST-608	1,625/4,080	1944-04-11	1950-07-01	1951-09-18	1959-04-15	Chicago Bridge and Iron Co.	LST Ulsan when acquired from Korea Shipping Corp.; Hull number assigned on 1951-09-18
LST-491 class	LST: Landing Ship Tank	803	Andong (An Tong)	안동 (安東)	USS LST-491	1,625/4,080	1943-09-23	1950-07-01	1951-09-18	1952-01-24	Missouri Valley Bridge and Iron Co.	LST Andong when acquired from Korea Shipping Corp.; Hull number assigned on 1951-09-18; Grounded near Jinnampo
LST-542 class	LST: Landing Ship Tank	805	Cheonbo (Chon Po)	천보 (天寶?)	USS LST-595	1,625/4,080	1944-08-16	1950-07-01	1952-09-03	1957-12-31	Missouri Valley Bridge and Iron Co.	LST Jochiwon when acquired from Korea Shipping Corp.
LST-1 class	LST: Landing Ship Tank	806	Yongbi (Ryong Pi)	용비 (龍飛?)	USS LST-388	1,625/4,080	1942-09-28	1950-07-01	1952-09-03	1958-09-11	Newport News Shipbuilding & Drydock Co.	LST Samnyangjin when acquired from Korea Shipping Corp.
LCS(L)(3)-1 class	LSSL: Landing Ship Support Large	107	Yeongheungman	영흥만 (永興灣)	USS LCS(L)(3)-77/LSSL-77	250/390	1945-02-26	1952-01-21	1952-05-03	1960-11-15	Albina Engine and Machine Works Inc.	Delivered in Astoria
LCS(L)(3)-1 class	LSSL: Landing Ship Support Large	108	Ganghwaman	강화만 (江華灣)	USS LCS(L)(3)-91/LSSL-91	250/390	1944-12-17	1952-01-21	1952-05-03	1960-11-15	Commercial Iron Works	Delivered in Astoria
LCS(L)(3)-1 class	LSSL: Landing Ship Support Large	109	Boseongman	보성만 (寶城灣)	USS LCS(L)(3)-54/LSSL-54	250/390	1944-09-05	1952-10-20	1953-01-10	1962-10-31	Albina Engine and Machine Works Inc.	Delivered in Yokosuka
LCS(L)(3)-1 class	LSSL: Landing Ship Support Large	110	Yeongilman	영일만 (迎日灣)	USS LCS(L)(3)-86/LSSL-86	250/390	1944-11-30	1952-10-20	1953-01-10	1962-10-31	Commercial Iron Works	Delivered in Yokosuka
LCI-351 class	LCI: Landing Craft Infantry	101	Seoul →Cheonan	서울→천안 (天安)	USS LCI(M)-594	246/419	1944-04-17	1946-09-15	1946-10-29	1949-01-20	New Jersey Shipbuilding Corp.	Delivered in Busan
LCI-351 class	LCI: Landing Craft Infantry	102	Jinju	진주 (晋州)	USS LCI(G)-516	246/419	1943-12-08	1946-09-15	1946-11-11	1949-01-20	New Jersey Shipbuilding Corp.	Delivered in Busan
LCI-351 class	LCI: Landing Craft Infantry	103	Chuncheon	춘천 (春川)	USS LCI(L)-773	246/419	1944-07-02	1946-11-24	1947-01-03	1949-01-20	Commercial Iron Works	-
LCI-351 class	LCI: Landing Craft Infantry	104	Cheongju	청주 (淸州)	USS LCI(G)-453	246/419	1943-08-21	1946-11-24	1947-01-03	1949-01-20	New Jersey Shipbuilding Corp.	-
LCI-351 class	LCI: Landing Craft Infantry	105	Cheongjin	청진 (淸津)	USS LCI(M)-1056	246/419	1944-03-28	1946-12-23	1947-01-22	1956-03-15	Defoe Shipbuilding Co.	Became service craft YAG 2
LCI-351 class	LCI: Landing Craft Infantry	106	Jinnampo	진남포 (鎭南浦)	USS LCI(G)-442	246/419	1943-07-31	1946-12-23	1947-01-22	1953-12-01	New Jersey Shipbuilding Corp.	One of the seven LCIs transferred to the U.S. Army

=== Mine warfare ships ===
Minesweepers (YMS) were named for cities, counties and towns and mountains. Minelayers (JMS) were named for cities, counties, mountains, rivers, and a planet.

Class	ROKN classification	Hull number	Name (a.k.a.)	Hangul name (Hanja)	Formerly known as	Displacement (light/full, tons)	Launch date	Delivery date	Commission date	Decommission date	Builder	Note
YMS-1 class	YMS: Auxiliary Motor Minesweeper →AMS (1953) →MSC (1953) →MSC(O) (1958)	501	Geumgangsan →Gangjin	금강산 (金剛山) →강진 (康津)	USS YMS-354	270/320	1943-05-29	1947-04-06	1947-04-28	1959-05-30	Gibbs Gas Engine Co.	Name changed on 1950-07-16
YMS-1 class	YMS: Auxiliary Motor Minesweeper →AMS (1953) →MSC (1953) →MSC(O) (1958)	502	Gyeongju (Kyong Chu)	경주 (慶州)	USS YMS-358	270/320	1943-03-22	1947-04-06	1947-04-28	1962-05-10	Robert Jacob Inc.	-
YMS-1 class	YMS: Auxiliary Motor Minesweeper →AMS (1953) →MSC (1953) →MSC(O) (1958)	503	Gwangju (Kwang Chu)	광주 (光州)	USS YMS-413	270/320	1944-07-04	1947-04-06	1947-04-28	1974-01-21	Bellingham Marine Railway and Boat Building Co.	-
YMS-1 class	YMS: Auxiliary Motor Minesweeper →AMS (1953) →MSC (1953) →MSC(O) (1958)	504	Gaeseong	개성 (開城)	HMS BYMS-2006	270/320	-	1947-05-10	1947-06-02	1955-10-15	-	-
YMS-1 class	YMS: Auxiliary Motor Minesweeper →AMS (1953) →MSC (1953) →MSC(O) (1958)	505	Gimhae	김해 (金海)	USS YMS-356	270/320	-	1947-05-10	1947-06-02	1956-03-15	-	-
YMS-1 class	YMS: Auxiliary Motor Minesweeper →AMS (1953) →MSC (1953) →MSC(O) (1958)	506	Ganggye	강계 (江界)	USS YMS-392	270/320	-	1947-05-10	1947-06-02	1956-03-15	-	-
YMS-1 class	YMS: Auxiliary Motor Minesweeper →AMS (1953) →MSC (1953) →MSC(O) (1958)	507	Gangneung	강릉 (江陵)	USS YMS-463	270/320	1944-03-21	1947-05-10	1947-06-21	1959-06-15	C. Hilterbrant Drydock Co.	-
YMS-1 class	YMS: Auxiliary Motor Minesweeper →AMS (1953) →MSC (1953) →MSC(O) (1958)	508	Gangwha	강화 (江華)	USS YMS-245	270/320	-	1947-08-06	1947-11-11	1949-05-11	-	Abducted to N. Korea
YMS-1 class	YMS: Auxiliary Motor Minesweeper →AMS (1953) →MSC (1953) →MSC(O) (1958)	509	Gapyeong	가평 (加平)	USS YMS-220	270/320	-	1947-08-06	1947-11-11	1950-09-28	-	Struck a mine and sank near Guryongpo
YMS-1 class	YMS: Auxiliary Motor Minesweeper →AMS (1953) →MSC (1953) →MSC(O) (1958)	510	Ganggyeong	강경 (江景)	USS YMS-330	270/320	1943-03-27	1947-08-06	1947-11-11	1963-04-30	Ballard Marine Railway Co., Inc.	-
YMS-1 class	YMS: Auxiliary Motor Minesweeper →AMS (1953) →MSC (1953) →MSC(O) (1958)	511	Gayasan	가야산 (伽倻山)	USS YMS-423	270/320	1944-08-05	1947-08-06	1947-11-11	1949-02-24	Astoria Marine Construction Co.	Grounded and sank near Geomundo
YMS-1 class	YMS: Auxiliary Motor Minesweeper →AMS (1953) →MSC (1953) →MSC(O) (1958)	512	Guwolsan	구월산 (九月山)	USS YMS-323	270/320	1943-07-15	1947-08-06	1947-11-11	1956-03-15	Al Larson Boat Shop, Inc.	-
YMS-1 class	YMS: Auxiliary Motor Minesweeper →AMS (1953) →MSC (1953) →MSC(O) (1958)	513	Gimcheon	김천 (金泉)	HMS BYMS-2258	270/320	-	1947-08-06	1947-11-11	1969-02-28	-	-
YMS-1 class	YMS: Auxiliary Motor Minesweeper →AMS (1953) →MSC (1953) →MSC(O) (1958)	514	Gilju	길주 (吉州)	HMS BYMS-2005	270/320	-	1947-08-30	1947-09-21	1956-03-15	-	-
YMS-1 class	YMS: Auxiliary Motor Minesweeper →AMS (1953) →MSC (1953) →MSC(O) (1958)	515	Gyeongsan	경산 (慶山)	HMS BYMS-2018	270/320	-	1947-08-30	1947-09-21	1948-02-21	-	Grounded and sank near Biyangdo
YMS-1 class	YMS: Auxiliary Motor Minesweeper →AMS (1953) →MSC (1953) →MSC(O) (1958)	515	Unnam →Goryeong (Ko Yung)	운남 (雲南?) →고령 (高靈)	HMS BYMS-2055	270/320	1942-12-07	1949-10-25	1949-10-25	1959-06-30	Westergard Boat Works	Acquired from Korea Shipping Corp.; Hull number assigned on 1950-07-01
YMS-1 class	YMS: Auxiliary Motor Minesweeper →AMS (1953) →MSC (1953) →MSC(O) (1958)	516	Gongju	공주 (公州)	HMS BYMS-2148	270/320	1942-12-07	1947-11-29	1947-02-20	1950-10-16	Western Boat Building Co.	Struck a mine and sank near Wonsan
YMS-1 class	YMS: Auxiliary Motor Minesweeper →AMS (1953) →MSC (1953) →MSC(O) (1958)	517	Gowon	고원 (高原)	USS YMS-473	270/320	-	1947-08-06	1947-11-11	1948-05-15	-	Abducted to N. Korea
YMS-1 class	YMS: Auxiliary Motor Minesweeper →AMS (1953) →MSC (1953) →MSC(O) (1958)	518	Yonggung →Goseong	용궁 (龍宮?) →고성 (固城)	HMS BYMS-2008	270/320	-	1948-01-14	1947-07-xx	1955-10-15	-	-
IJN Service Craft - Tug Minelayer (雑役船 -曳船 (敷設艇型))	JMS: Japanese Minelayer →AMC (1953)	301	Daejeon	대전 (大田)	No. 1313 (公稱第1313號)	156/180	1940-12-11	1946-10-09	1946-11-11	1953-10-20	Fujinagata Shipyards	Transferred to Coast Guard
IJN Service Craft - Tug Minelayer (雑役船 -曳船 (敷設艇型))	JMS: Japanese Minelayer →AMC (1953)	302	Tongyeong	통영 (統營)	No. 1314	156/180	1940-12-11	1946-10-09	1946-11-11	1953-10-20	Fujinagata Shipyards	Transferred to Coast Guard
IJN Service Craft - Tug Minelayer (雑役船 -曳船 (敷設艇型))	JMS: Japanese Minelayer →AMC (1953)	303	Daegu	대구 (大邱)	No. 1372	156/180	1941-04-11	1946-10-09	1946-11-11	1953-10-20	Ujina Shipyards (宇品造船所)	Transferred to Coast Guard
IJN Service Craft - Tug Minelayer (雑役船 -曳船 (敷設艇型))	JMS: Japanese Minelayer →AMC (1953)	304	Taebaeksan	태백산 (太白山)	No. 1373	156/180	1942-02-02	1946-10-09	1946-11-11	1953-10-20	Ujina Shipyards	Transferred to Coast Guard
IJN Service Craft - Tug Minelayer (雑役船 -曳船 (敷設艇型))	JMS: Japanese Minelayer →AMC (1953)	305	Dumangang	두만강 (豆滿江)	No. 1121	156/180	1939-10-18	1946-12-23	1947-01-09	1950-06-29	Ujina Shipyards	Sunk by friendly fire from USS Juneau (CL-119)
IJN Service Craft - Tug Minelayer (雑役船 -曳船 (敷設艇型))	JMS: Japanese Minelayer →AMC (1953)	306	Danyang	단양 (丹陽)	No. 1009	156/180	1939-11-xx (completion)	1947-03-30	1947-04-08	1951-05-05	Ujina Shipyards	Struck a mine and sank near Jinnampo
IJN Service Craft - Tug Minelayer (雑役船 -曳船 (敷設艇型))	JMS: Japanese Minelayer →AMC (1953)	307	Dancheon	단천 (端川)	No. 1269	156/180	1941-01-30	1947-03-30	1947-10-03	1953-10-20	Ujina Shipyards	Transferred to Coast Guard
IJN Service Craft - Tug Minelayer (雑役船 -曳船 (敷設艇型))	JMS: Japanese Minelayer →AMC (1953)	308	Toseong	토성 (土星)	Daiichikadogawamaru (第1門川丸)	156/180	1944-10-xx	1947-05-15	1947-10-03	1956-03-15	Kyushu Shipbuilding - Hyuga Shipyard (九州造船日向工場)	Became service craft YAG 3; Might be abducted to N. Korea on 1970-06-05 as I 2
IJN Service Craft - Tug Minelayer (雑役船 -曳船 (敷設艇型))	JMS: Japanese Minelayer →AMC (1953)	309	Daedonggang	대동강 (大同江)	No. 1008	156/180	1938-10-31 (completion)	1947-05-15	1947-10-03	1953-10-20	Ujina Shipyards	Transferred to Coast Guard
IJN Service Craft - Tug Minelayer (雑役船 -曳船 (敷設艇型))	JMS: Japanese Minelayer →AMC (1953)	310	Deokcheon	덕천 (德川)	No. 1217	156/180	1939-12-27	1947-05-15	1947-10-03	1956-03-15	Mitsubishi Heavy Industries - Kobe Shipyard	Became service craft YAG 1; Might be abducted to N. Korea on 1970-06-05 as I 2
IJN Service Craft - Tug Minelayer (雑役船 -曳船 (敷設艇型))	JMS: Japanese Minelayer →AMC (1953)	311	Tongcheon	통천 (通川)	No. 1216	156/180	1939-12-27	1946-12-23	1947-01-09	1948-05-07	Mitsubishi Heavy Industries - Kobe Shipyard	Abducted to N. Korea

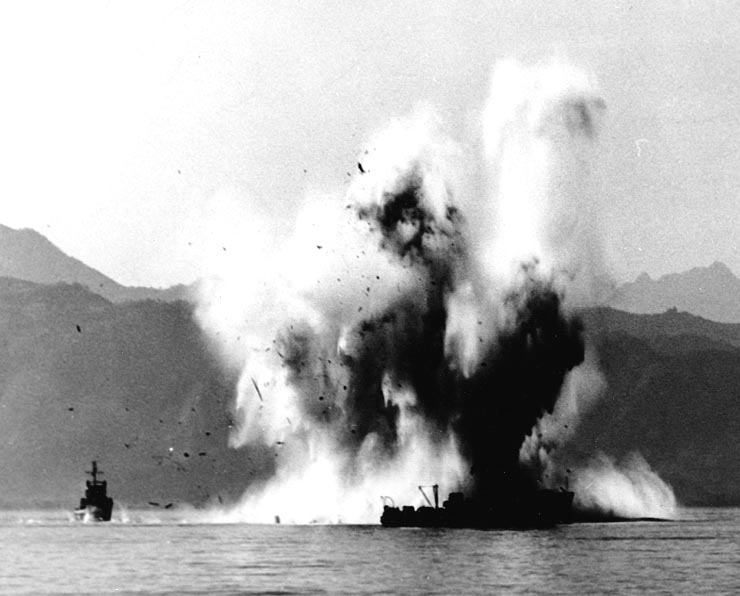
ROKS Gongju (YMS 516) blown up by mine off Wonsan in 1950

=== Auxiliary ships ===
AKLs were named for port towns. AOs were named for lakes. YO was named for a waterfall.

ATA was named for a mountain near Seoul.

Class	ROKN classification	Hull number	Name (a.k.a.)	Hangul name (Hanja)	Formerly known as	Displacement (light/full, tons)	Launch date	Delivery date	Commission date	Decommission date	Builder	Note
U.S. Army FS Design 330	AKL: Light Cargo Ship	901	Busan	부산 (釜山)	FS-162	460/811	-	1949-07-01	1949-07-01	1958-07-15	Higgins Industries	FS Namwon when acquired from Korea Shipping Corp
U.S. Army FS Design 330	AKL: Light Cargo Ship	902	Incheon →Jemulpo (1974)	인천 (仁川) →제물포 (濟物浦)	FS-198	460/811	-	1950-07-01	1951-09-18	1978-04-01	Higgins Industries	FS Gimhae when acquired from Korea Shipping Corp.; Hull number assigned on 1951-09-18; Became intelligence ship after decommission
U.S. Army FS Design 381	AKL: Light Cargo Ship	903	Wonsan	원산 (元山)	FS-254	520/940	-	1950-07-01	1951-09-18	1958-07-15	Wheeler SB	FS Yeosu when acquired from Korea Shipping Corp.; Hull number assigned on 1951-09-18
U.S. Army FS Design 381	AKL: Light Cargo Ship	905	Jinnampo	진남포 (鎭南浦)	FS-356	520/940	-	1950-07-01	1951-09-27	1971-10-28	J. K. Welding	FS Waegwan when acquired from Korea Shipping Corp.; 2nd Jinnampo after LCI 106
U.S. Army FS Design 381	AKL: Light Cargo Ship	906	Seongjin	성진 (城津)	FS-285	520/940	-	1950-07-01	1952-09-03	1958-07-15	Wheeler SB	FS Chungju when acquired from Korea Shipping Corp.
-	O →AO: Oiler	2 →AO 51^{a}	Cheonji	천지 (天池)	Hassel	2,698/4,218	1951-xx-xx	1953-06-30	1953-09-17	1982-11-30	A/S Berken Mek Verks	Norwegian-built; AO 2
-	O →AO: Oiler	3	Bujeon → Bucheon (1966)	부전 (赴戰) →부천 (富川)	Birk	2,698/4,218	-	1953-08-31	-	1971-06-28	A/S Berken Mek Verks	Norwegian-built; Grounded near Heukdo; AO 3
YO-65 class	YO: Fuel Oil Barge →AO	YO 1 →YO 106 →YO 1 (1955) →AO 1 (1956) →YO 1 (1963)	Guryong	구룡 (九龍)	USS YO-118	440/1,390	1943 (laid down)	1946-12-04	1946-12-24	1971-09-13	RTC Shipbuilding	Hull number changed to 106 on 1948-08-30
US Army Ocean Tug	LT: Large Tug →ATA	1	Inwang	인왕 (仁王)	LT-134	435/601	-	1950-07-05	1950-07-05	1960-10-20	Tampa Marine	Acquired from Ministry of Transportation; LT 1 → ATA 1

== See also ==
- List of active Republic of Korea Navy ships

== Notes ==
1. Hull number: The ROK Navy does not use the number '4' when assigning hull numbers to their ships since ROKS Jirisan (PC 704; formerly USS PC-810), during the Korean War, struck a mine and sank in December 1951, resulting in death of all sailors aboard. Currently only the hull numbers of the mine layers and submarine tender end with number '0'. The hull numbers of the submarines start with the number '0'.
2. Romanization of Ship names: Romanization is according to Revised Romanization of Korean (adopted in 2000), with exceptions of personal names. Names of ships commissioned before 2000 might have been romanized according to McCune–Reischauer. Examples of changes (M-R → RR): Chinhae → Jinhae; Kangnung → Gangneung; Kimpo → Gimpo; Kyongju → Gyeongju; Pusan → Busan; Taegu → Daegu.
3. Delivery date: The date when the ROK Navy acquires a ship.

^{a}: Hull number changed on 1978-06-01
