= ROKS Sinseong =

ROKS Sinseong is the name of two Republic of Korea Navy warships:

- ROKS Sinseong (PCE-1001), a Auk-class minesweeper from 1963 to 1984.
- ROKS Sinseong (PCC-783), a Pohang-class corvette from 1992 to present.
