= ROKS Gunsan =

ROKS Gunsan is the name of two Republic of Korea Navy warships:

- ROKS Gunsan (AKL-908), a Camano-class cargo ship in 1955.
- ROKS Gunsan (PCC-757), a Pohang-class corvette from 1984 to 2011.
