= ROKS Jinju =

Pohang-class corvette of the Republic of Korea Navy

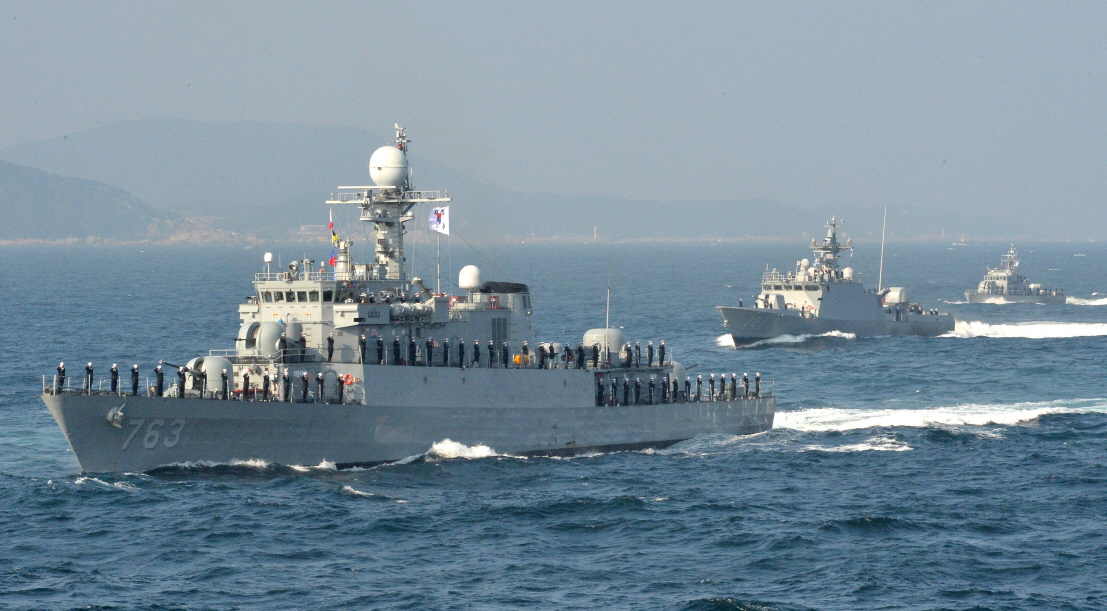
- ROKS Jinju on 19 October 2015

History

South Korea
- Name: Jinju; (진주)
- Namesake: Jinju
- Builder: Hyundai, Ulsan
- Launched: 12 February 1986
- Commissioned: 1 November 1986
- Decommissioned: 31 December 2016
- Identification: Pennant number: PCC-763
- Fate: Gifted to Egyptian Navy in 2017

Egypt
- Name: Shabab Misr; (شباب مصر)
- Namesake: Shabab Misr; (Youth of Egypt)
- Acquired: 26 October 2017
- Commissioned: 26 October 2017
- Home port: Alexandria
- Identification: Pennant number: 1000
- Status: Active

General characteristics
- Class & type: Pohang-class corvette
- Displacement: 1,220 tons
- Length: 289.7 ft (88 m)
- Beam: 10 m (33 ft)
- Draft: 2.9 ft (0.88 m)
- Installed power: 2 × MTU 6V396 TC52 diesel generators
- Propulsion: Combined diesel or gas (CODOG) arrangement: 2 × MTU 12V956 TB82 diesel engines producing combined total of 6,260 shp (4,670 kW); 1 × General Electric LM2500 PB gas turbines generating 27,820 shp (20,700 kW)
- Speed: 32 knots (59 km/h; 37 mph) maximum
- Range: 4,000 nmi (7,400 km; 4,600 mi) at 15 knots (28 km/h; 17 mph) using diesel engines
- Endurance: 20 days
- Boats & landing craft carried: 2 × RHIB
- Crew: 118
- Sensors & processing systems: X-band & S-band navigational radars; Raytheon AN/SPS-64(V)5B surface search radar; Signaal (Thales Nederland) WM-28 Fire Control System; Signaal (Thales Nederland) LIOD optronic director; Raytheon AN/SQS-58 hull mounted passive/active sonar
- Electronic warfare & decoys: 2 × Loral Hycor Mk 34 RBOC Chaff and Decoy Launching System
- Armament: 2 × Oto Melara 76 mm/62 caliber Compact naval guns; 2 × Otobreda 40mm L/70 twin naval guns; 2 × Mk 32 triple torpedo tubes; 2 × Mk 9 Depth Charge Racks; 6 × M2HB Browning .50 caliber machine guns

ROKS Jinju (PCC-763) was a Pohang-class corvette of the Republic of Korea Navy. She was decommissioned and gifted to Egyptian Navy, renamed ENS Shabab Misr (1000).

== Development and design ==
The Pohang class is a series of corvettes built by different Korean shipbuilding companies. The class consists of 24 ships and some after decommissioning are sold or given to other countries. There are five different types of designs in the class from Flight II to Flight VI.

== Construction and career ==
Jinju was launched on 12 February 1986 by Hyundai Heavy Industries in Ulsan. Commissioned on 1 November 1986 and decommissioned on 31 December 2016.

On 26 October 2017, the ship arrived at Alexandria Naval Base after being gifted by the Republic of Korea Navy. She was renamed ENS Shabab Misr and with the pennant number 1000.

== Gallery ==
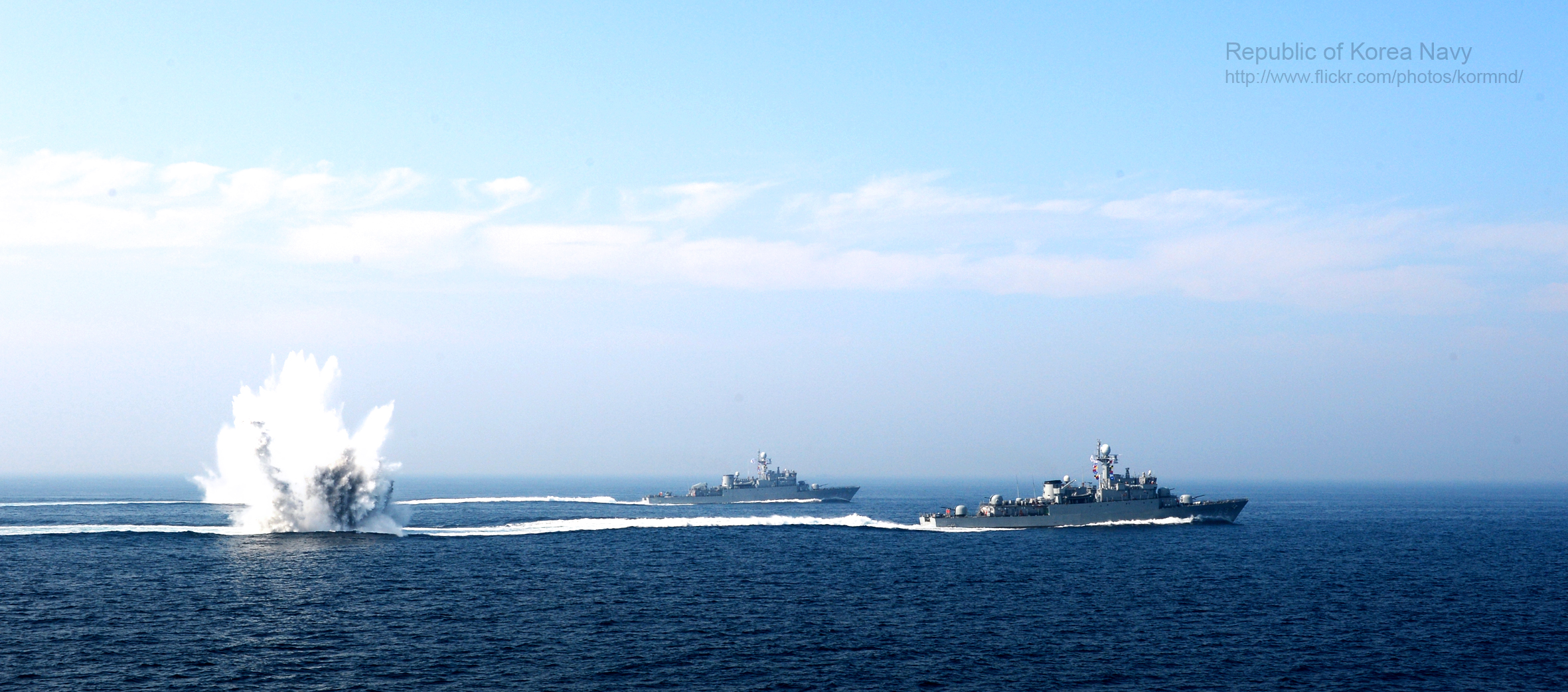
ROKS Jinju during an exercise on 24 June 2013.

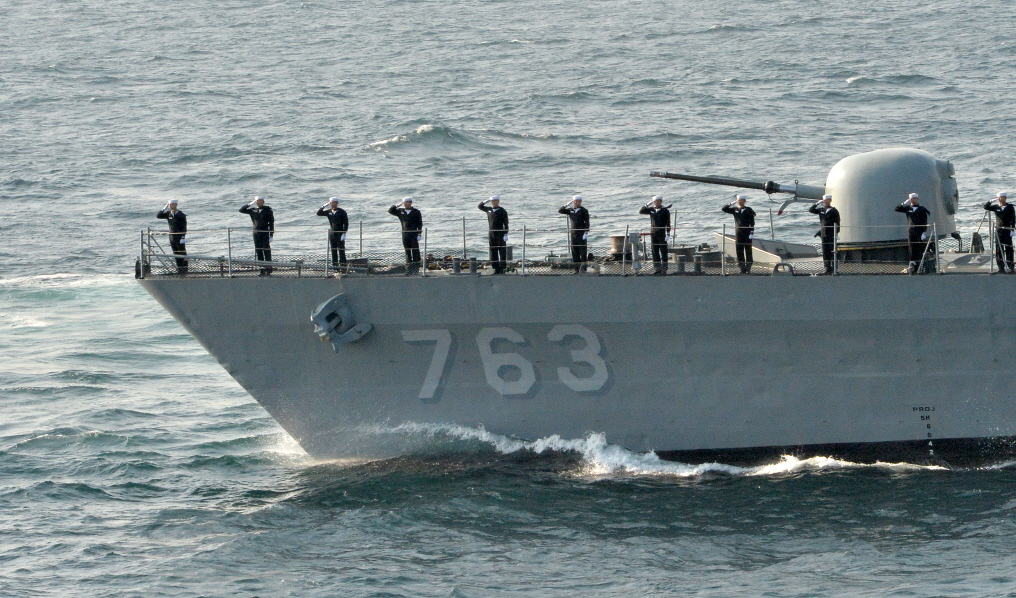
ROKS Jinju underway on 19 October 2015.

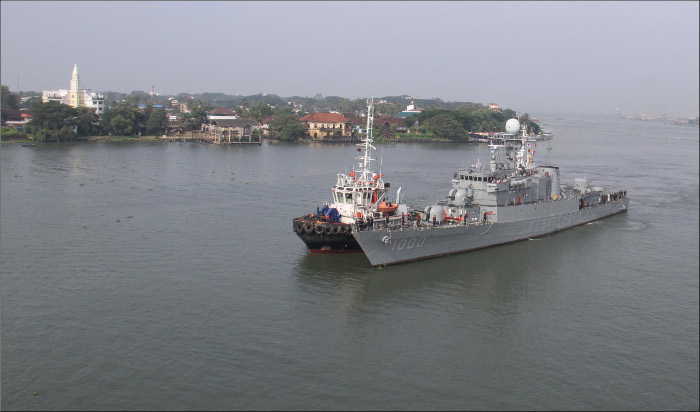
ENS Shabab Misr arrives at Kochi on 9 October 2017.

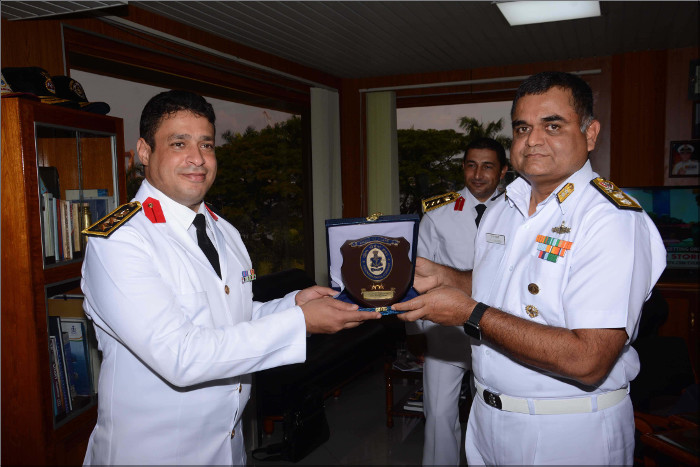
Indian Navy Rear Admiral presenting a memento to the Captain of Shabab Misr on 9 October 2017.

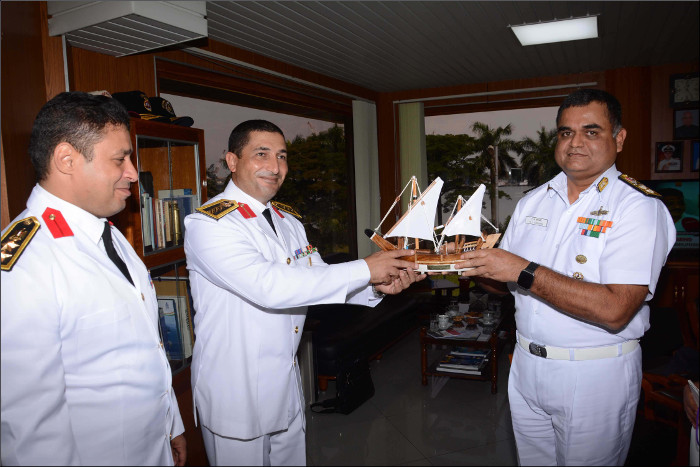
Indian Navy Rear Admiral presenting a memento to the Captain of Shabab Misr on 9 October 2017.

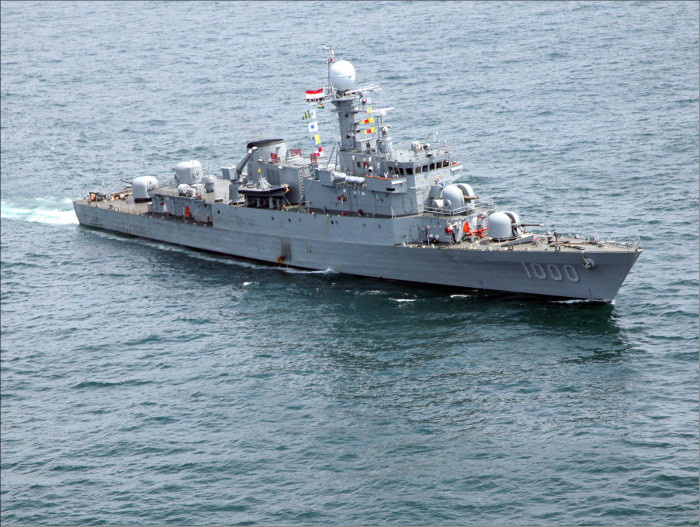
ENS Shabab Misr leaving at Kochi on 11 October 2017.
