= ROKS Yeongju =

Pohang-class corvette

History

South Korea
- Name: Yeongju; (영주)
- Namesake: Yeongju
- Builder: Hyundai
- Launched: 27 July 1988
- Commissioned: 20 April 1990
- Decommissioned: 30 December 2022
- Identification: Callsign: HLDD; Pennant number: PCC-779
- Status: Retired

General characteristics
- Class & type: Pohang-class corvette
- Displacement: 1,220 tons
- Length: 289.7 ft (88 m)
- Beam: 33 ft (10 m)
- Draft: 2.9 ft (0.88 m)
- Installed power: 2 × MTU 6V396 TC52 diesel generators
- Propulsion: Combined diesel or gas (CODOG) arrangement: 2 × MTU 12V956 TB82 diesel engines producing combined total of 6,260 shp (4,670 kW); 1 × General Electric LM2500 PB gas turbines generating 27,820 shp (20,700 kW)
- Speed: 32 knots (59 km/h; 37 mph) maximum
- Range: 4,000 nmi (7,400 km; 4,600 mi) at 15 knots (28 km/h; 17 mph) using diesel engines
- Endurance: 20 days
- Boats & landing craft carried: 2 × RHIB
- Crew: 118
- Sensors & processing systems: X-band & S-band navigational radars; AN/SPS-55 surface search radar; SPS-300K; Radamec 2400 Fire Control System; WSA-423 Combat System; Marconi S1810 search radar; Marconi ST1802 tracking radar; Raytheon AN/SQS-58 hull mounted passive/active sonar
- Electronic warfare & decoys: 4 × Mel Protean Chaff Launchers; SLQ-260KA2; SLQ-261K TACM
- Armament: 2 × Oto Melara 76 mm/62 caliber Compact naval guns; 2 × Otobreda 40mm L/70 twin naval guns; 2 × Mk 32 triple torpedo tubes; 2 × SSM-700K Haeseong; 2 × Mk 9 Depth Charge Racks; 6 × M2HB Browning .50 caliber machine guns

ROKS Yeongju (PCC-779) is a Pohang-class corvette of the Republic of Korea Navy.

== Development and design ==
The Pohang class is a series of corvettes built by different Korean shipbuilding companies. The class consists of 24 ships and some after decommissioning were sold or given to other countries. There are five different types of designs in the class from Flight II to Flight VI.

== Construction and career ==
Yeongju was launched on 27 July 1988 by Hyundai Heavy Industries. The vessel was commissioned on 20 April 1990.

Two sailors belonging to the ship rescued a civilian who fell into a sinkhole on the sidewalk in Poseung-eup, Pyeongtaek-si, near the ship, while out on the evening of August 5. Safety measures contributed to preventing further accidents.

Yeongju was decommissioned on 30 December 2022.
