= ROKS Jecheon =

Pohang-class corvette

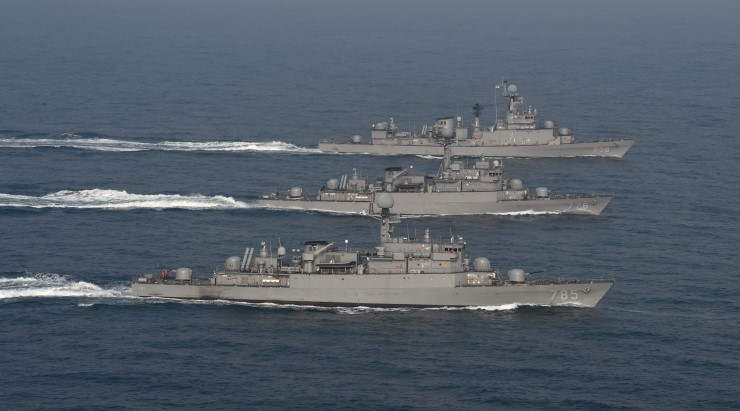
- ROKS Jecheon on 15 January 2016

History

South Korea
- Name: Jecheon; (제천)
- Namesake: Jecheon
- Builder: Hanjin
- Launched: 8 December 1987
- Commissioned: 3 May 1989
- Decommissioned: 31 December 2021
- Identification: Callsign: HLDD; Pennant number: PCC-776
- Status: Decommissioned, transferred to Vietnam People's Navy

Vietnam
- Name: Ship 21
- Acquired: 11 November 2025
- Commissioned: 22 December 2025
- Identification: Hull number: 21
- Status: Active

General characteristics
- Class & type: Pohang-class corvette
- Displacement: 1,220 tons
- Length: 289.7 ft (88 m)
- Beam: 33 ft (10 m)
- Draft: 2.9 ft (0.88 m)
- Installed power: 2 × MTU 6V396 TC52 diesel generators
- Propulsion: Combined diesel or gas (CODOG) arrangement: 2 × MTU 12V956 TB82 diesel engines producing combined total of 6,260 shp (4,670 kW); 1 × General Electric LM2500 PB gas turbines generating 27,820 shp (20,700 kW)
- Speed: 32 knots (59 km/h; 37 mph) maximum
- Range: 4,000 nmi (7,400 km; 4,600 mi) at 15 knots (28 km/h; 17 mph) using diesel engines
- Endurance: 20 days
- Boats & landing craft carried: 2 × RHIB
- Crew: 118
- Sensors & processing systems: X-band & S-band navigational radars; Raytheon AN/SPS-64(V)5B surface search radar; Signaal (Thales Nederland) WM-28 Fire Control System; Signaal (Thales Nederland) LIOD optronic director; Raytheon AN/SQS-58 hull mounted passive/active sonar
- Electronic warfare & decoys: 2 × Loral Hycor Mk 34 RBOC Chaff and Decoy Launching System
- Armament: 2 × Oto Melara 76 mm/62 caliber Compact naval guns; 2 × Otobreda 40mm L/70 twin naval guns; 2 × Mk 32 triple torpedo tubes; 2 × Mk 9 Depth Charge Racks; 6 × M2HB Browning .50 caliber machine guns

ROKS Jecheon (PCC-776) is a Pohang-class corvette of the Republic of Korea Navy.

== Development and design ==
The Pohang class is a series of corvettes built by different Korean shipbuilding companies. The class consists of 24 ships and some after decommissioning were sold or given to other countries. There are five different types of designs in the class from Flight II to Flight VI.

== Construction and career ==
Jecheon was launched on 8 December 1987 by Hanjin Heavy Industries. The vessel was commissioned on 3 May 1989.

While being moored in her namesake city, Jecheon on 18 August 2018, Deputy Mayor Geum Han-ju and 35 other people, including members of the Integrated Defense Council, members of security and local organizations, and citizens from all walks of life, visited the ship.

During the State Visit of the General Secretary of the Communist Party of Vietnam Tô Lâm to South Korea, representatives from the Ministry of Defense of both countries witnessed the signing of the Memorandum of Understanding about the transfer of ROKS Jecheon to the Vietnam People's Navy.

== Gallery ==
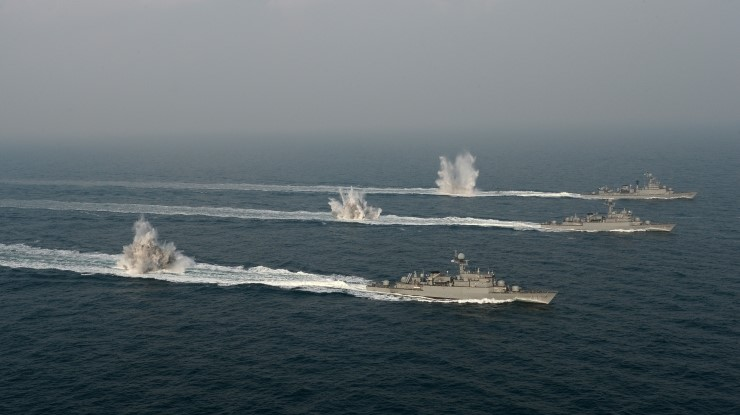
ROKS Jecheon on 15 January 2016
