= ROKS Gunsan (PCC-757) =

South Korean ship

History

South Korea
- Name: Gunsan
- Namesake: Gunsan
- Builder: Hyundai Heavy Industries Co., Ltd., Ulsan, South Korea
- Launched: 27 March 1984
- Commissioned: 1984
- Decommissioned: 29 September 2011
- Identification: PCC-757

General characteristics
- Class & type: Pohang-class corvette
- Displacement: 1,200 tonnes
- Length: 88 m (288 ft 9 in)
- Draft: 2.9 m (9 ft 6 in)
- Propulsion: CODOG unit
- Speed: Maximum 32 knots (59 km/h; 37 mph); Cruising 15 knots (28 km/h; 17 mph)
- Range: 4,000 nautical miles (7,400 km; 4,600 mi)
- Crew: 104
- Armament: 4 × Harpoon missiles, 2 × OTO Melara 76 mm/62 compact cannons; 2 × Otobreda DARDO 40 mm/70 cannons, 6 × Mark 46 torpedoes, 12 × Mark 9 depth charges

ROKS Gunsan (PCC-757) is a Pohang-class corvette of the Republic of Korea Navy (ROKN). The ship is named after the South Korean city of Gunsan.

== Design ==
=== Armament ===
The ship's armament consists of two OTO Melara 76 mm/62 compact guns and two Otobreda DARDO 40 mm guns. The ship also carries Boeing RGM-84 Harpoon surface-to-surface missiles.

Gunsan was also supplied with six 12.75-inch (324 mm) Mark 46 torpedoes and twelve Mark 9 depth charges.

== Service history ==
In 1984, Gunsan was commissioned into the Korean Navy.

On 29 September 2011, Gunsan was decommissioned by the ROKN. The ship was to be transferred as a gift to the Colombian Navy, however, a Donghae-class corvette was exchanged instead.
