= Pohang-class corvette =

Ship class

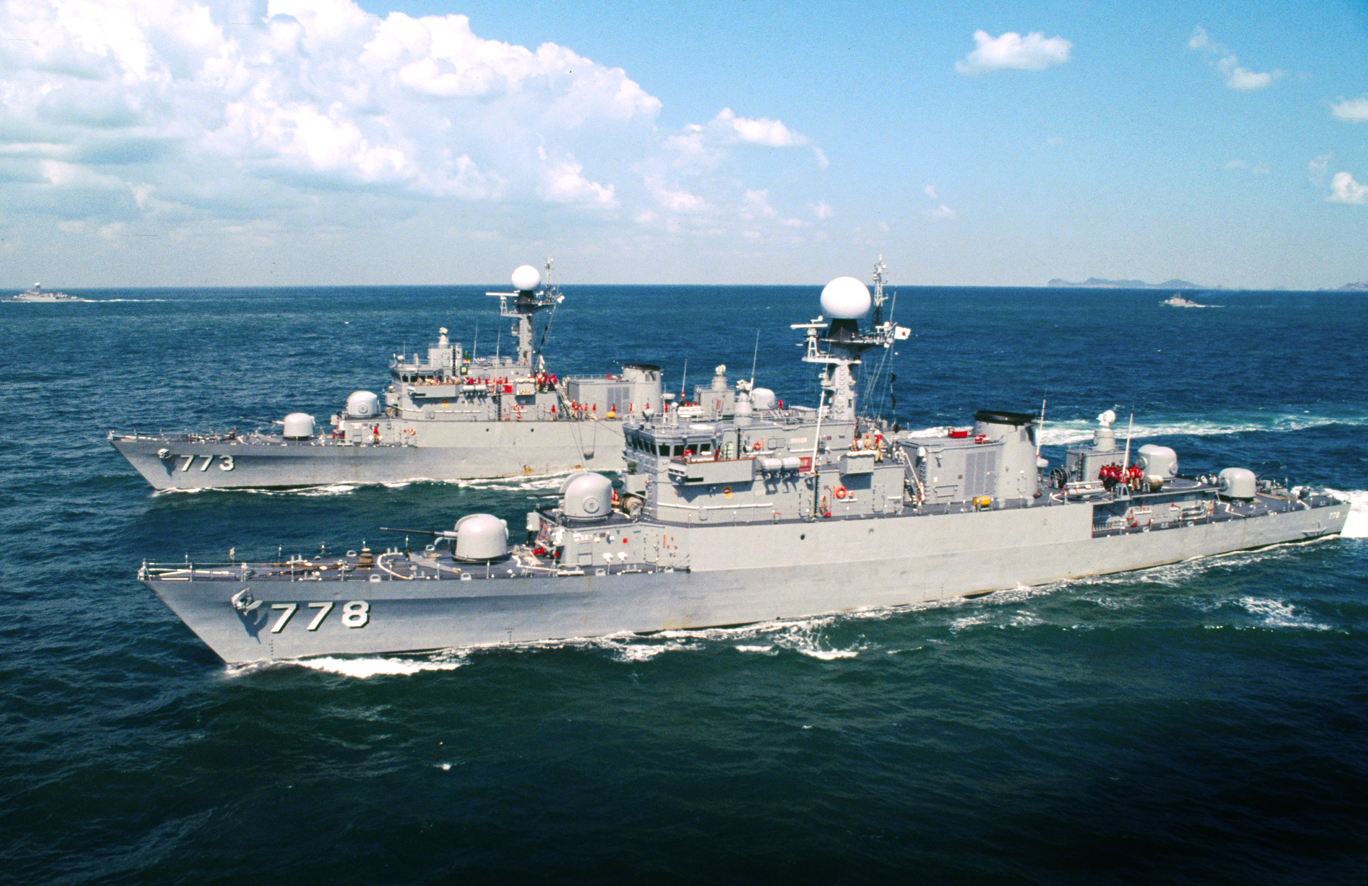
- ROKS Sokcho and Bucheon underway in 2007

Class overview
- Name: Pohang class
- Builders: Korea Shipbuilding Corporation; Korea Tacoma Shipyard; Hyundai Heavy Industries; Daewoo Shipbuilding; Hanjin Heavy Industries
- Operators: Republic of Korea Navy; Colombian National Navy; Egyptian Navy; Peruvian Navy; Philippine Navy; Vietnam People's Navy
- Preceded by: Donghae class
- Succeeded by: Incheon class
- In commission: 17 December 1984 – present
- Completed: 24
- Active: 10; 2 Republic of Korea Navy; 1 Colombian National Navy; 1 Egyptian Navy; 2 Peruvian Navy; 1 Philippine Navy; 3 Vietnam People's Navy
- Retired: 14
- Preserved: 3

General characteristics
- Type: Corvette
- Displacement: 950 t (empty); 1,220 t (full)
- Length: 88.3 m (289 ft 8 in)
- Beam: 10 m (32 ft 10 in)
- Draft: 2.9 m (9 ft 6 in)
- Propulsion: CODOG; 1 x GE LM2500 gas turbine engine; 2 x MTU 12V 956 TB82 diesel engine
- Speed: Maximum: 32 knots (59 km/h); Cruising: 15 knots (28 km/h)
- Range: 4,000 nautical miles (7,400 km)
- Crew: 95 (10 officers)
- Sensors & processing systems: Combat management system: Signaal SEWACO ZK (Batch II - III); Samsung/Ferranti WSA-423 (Batch IV - VI); Fire control system & radar: Signaal WM28 (Batch II - III); WSA-423 includes FCS (Batch IV - VI); Fire control radar: Samsung/Marconi S1810 (Batch IV - VI); Samsung/Marconi ST1802 (Batch V - VI); Surface search radar: Raytheon AN/SPS-64 (Batch II - VI); STX SPS-300K (Batch IV - VI, after 2014); Optronic director: Signaal LIOD (Batch II - III); Samsung/Radamec 2400 (Batch IV - VI); Sonar: EDO 786 (Batch II); Raytheon AN/SQS-58 (Batch III - VI)
- Electronic warfare & decoys: Mk 36 SRBOC; GoldStar ULQ-12K ESM; SLQ-261K TACM (Batch IV - VI, after 2012); Victek SLQ-201K ESM (Batch IV - VI, after 2019)
- Armament: Primary gun: 1 x OTO Melara 76 mm/62 cannon (Batch II); 2 x OTO Melara 76 mm/62 cannon (Batch III - VI); Secondary gun: 2 x Emerson EMERLEC 30 twin Oerlikon 30 mm/75 KCB cannon (Batch II); 2 x Breda DARDO CIWS twin Bofors 40 mm/70 cannon (Batch III - VI); Anti-ship: 2 x MM38 Exocet SSM (Batch II); 2 x 2 RGM-84C Harpoon SSM (Batch IV, after 1999); 2 x 2 SSM-700K C-Star SSM (Batch V - VI, after 2007); 2 x 4 VCM-01M SSM (Vietnamese retrofitting); Anti-submarine: 2 x triple Mark 32 SVTT loaded with; Mark 46 ASW torpedo, or; K745 Blue Shark ASW torpedo (after 2006); 12 x Mk 9 or KMk 9 depth charge; Anti-air: Mistral MANPADS (after 2000); Other armaments: 2 x K6 HMG; 2 x M60 Machine guns

The Pohang-class PCC (Patrol Combat Corvette) (Korean: 포항급 초계함, Hanja: 浦項級哨戒艦) is the low-end complement of the high-low mix domestic naval construction plan of the Republic of Korea Navy under the 1st Yulgok Project (1974-1986) for the Republic of Korea Armed Forces. It was originally planned as a Batch II production of Donghae-class corvette, but many changes on overall design, notably applying the hull design of Ulsan-class frigate, reclassified the ship to its own class. The ship is designed for patrolling maritime border, including the Northern Limit Line, protecting the littoral zone, and combating the North Korean vessels.

Since 1984, a total of 24 Pohang-class corvettes were commissioned in the Republic of Korea Navy. The decommission of the class started in 2009, and is being replaced with series of FFX program. As of December 2025, 2 remain in service in the ROKN, and 8 were transferred to other navies.

== Development ==
The Pohang-class corvette was originally intended to be a Batch II version of the Donghae-class corvette.

During the design phase of the Donghae-class corvette, there was some debate between the designers regarding the shape of the hull. Captain Eom Do-jae, who was also supervising the construction of the Ulsan-class frigate at the time, believed that a new corvette should have a narrow V-shaped hull, similar to the Ulsan-class frigate design. However, according to other designers, based on experiences from the ships operated by the ROKN, the Noryang-class PCEC (Patrol Craft Escort & Combatant) (ex-PCE-842-class) had the best size for the mission, and the Sinseong-class PCE (Patrol Craft Escort) (ex-Auk-class MSF), which had a U-shape hull, showed great ship stability at patrol speeds (5-8 knots). A further consideration was that a V-shape hull would require fin stabilizers, which were not favored by the ROKN due to difficulties with fin stabilizers of the Baekgu-class PGM (Patrol Gunboat Motor) (modified Asheville-class). As a result, the ROKN proceeded with implementing a U-shape design to achieve stability without the use of fin stabilizers for the Donghae-class.

Captain Eom subsequently persuaded ROKN naval command to change the hull design for the construction of the second batch of the Donghae-class corvette. The hull became a shape similar to that of Ulsan-class, and many of the internal and external structures were redesigned. Ultimately this Batch II version was sufficiently different from the original Donghae class that it was reclassified into the Pohang class. The decision to install fin stabilizers on the Pohang-class corvette was decided by the ROKN only a month prior to the launch of the ROKS Pohang due to feedback from the ROKS Ulsan (which was constructed without fin stabilizers). To meet the new fin stabilizer requirement, internal parts were relocated under a tight schedule.

The Pohang-class is about 10 m longer, 100 t heavier, and 1 knot faster (with a maximum speed of 32 knots) than the Donghae-class thanks to a better speed-length ratio. During sea trials, the ROKS Pohang achieved speed of 35 knots. Successful testing of fin stabilizers prompted their subsequent installation on all Pohang and Ulsan-class.

== General characteristics ==
The Pohang-class is powered by one General Electric LM2500 gas turbine engine and two MTU Friedrichshafen 12V 956 TB82 diesel engines for combined diesel or gas (CODOG) propulsion system, which allows full displacement of 1,220 t ship to move at 32 kn maximum and 15 kn cruising speed. The main armament is focused on surface combat to counter numerous and small North Korean ships, which is controlled by Signaal SEWACO ZK combat management system combined with Signaal WM28 fire-control system and fire-control radar, Raytheon AN/SPS-64 surface-search radar, and Signaal LIOD optronic director. For anti-submarine mission, the ship has installed EDO 786 sonar and armed with 2 x triple Mark 32 Surface Vessel Torpedo Tubes firing Mark 46 torpedo.

However, the ship lacks air-search radar along with anti-air weapon, which was the biggest topic among the militaries of the world as a result of the Falklands War, due to low on budget. The ship has limited defense capability against air and missile attack, only assisted by GoldStar ULQ-12K ESM (electronic support measures) and Mk 36 SRBOC (Super Rapid Bloom Offboard Countermeasures).

The Pohang-class received multiple changes and upgrades during the construction, and in service with the Republic of Korea Navy. The ESM and other sensitive systems, depending on the recipient, are dismounted from the ship, while some are installed when transferred to other nations.

According to Philippines, it spent $4.8 million (2019) for refurbishment with South Korea covering drydock works. Per Indonesian officials, overhaul and upgrade to Indonesian service standard costs $85 million (2024).

=== Batch II ===
4 ships built. The Batch II removed twin Bofors 40mm/60 cannon, and mounted two Aérospatiale MM38 Exocet surface-to-surface missile launchers.

=== Batch III ===
4 ships built. The Batch III heavily enhanced its gun system by installing additional OTO Melara 76 mm/62 cannon, and replacing 2 x Emerson EMERLEC 30 twin Oerlikon 30 mm/75 KCB cannon with 2 x Breda DARDO CIWS twin Bofors 40 mm/70 cannon, which is capable of engaging aircraft and cruise missile. The sonar was upgraded to Raytheon AN/SQS-58 to increase anti-submarine warfare capability while MM38 Exocet was removed from the ship.

=== Batch IV ===
10 ships built. The Batch IV was the most critical upgrade and change of the Pohang-class. The ship changed the combat management system to WSA-423 (Weapon Ship Automation-423) in collaboration of Samsung Aerospace Industries (later Hanwha Systems) and the British Ferranti, which became the backbone of the Republic of Korea Navy's Baseline 1.0 ICMS (Integrated Combat Management System) dubbed as "Naval Shield". Installation of this unproven system caused delays in delivering the ship. Additional system changes include Marconi S1810 fire control radar and Radamec 2400 optronic director, both localized by Samsung.

=== Batch V/VI ===
6 ships built. The Batch V/VI has a structure difference from previous Batch. These ships added a Samsung/Marconi ST1802 fire control radar to improve gun control.

== Operational history ==
In 1986, ROKS Pohang sunk an armed North Korean vessel as it ignored warnings after crossing the NLL of the Sea of Japan.

In 1991, ROKS Gimcheon detected a submerged Soviet Union submarine at east of Pohang during patrol; the ship monitored and pursued the submarine.

On 11:50 AM of 20 April 1996, two of the seven North Korean patrol crafts crossed the NLL during training exercise. The corvettes were sent to intercept, and confronted until North Korean vessels retreated back to the NLL on 1:20 PM.

On 1:30 AM of 18 September 1996, a local taxi driver found a grounded North Korean Sang-O-class submarine on the coast of Gangneung. ROKS Gyeongju along with other vessels were sent to block runways via sea by North Korean spy agents, and surveil enemy vessels in the area.

On 2:05 PM of 29 May 1997, a North Korean patrol craft crossed the NLL. The corvette was sent with three patrol craft to intercept. North Korean vessel returned to the NLL on 3:00 PM.

On 4:33 PM of 22 June 1998, a South Korean fishing boat reported a North Korean Yugo-class submarine was tangled by fishing net at 20.7 km east of Sokcho. The ROKN dispatched ships including ROKS Gunsan and ROKS Mokpo and aircraft to secure the scene. On 7:25 PM, ROKS Gunsan started towing the submarine to nearby naval base. All North Korean operators were found dead inside the submarine—committing group suicide before being captured.

On 11:15 PM of 17 December 1988, an army private found a North Korean semi-submarine near Yeosu using TOD. ROKS Namwon and ROKS Gwangmyeong were sent to search and catch the semi-submarine. The submarine opened machinegun fire at chasing ships, then was sunk by ROKS Gwangmyeong.

On 9:10 AM of 7 June 1999, a North Korean patrol boat crossed the NLL in an excuse for protecting fishing boat. Since then, multiple North Korean fishing boats and patrol boats crossed the line back and forth. Two navies fought by ramming each other, which caused heavy damage on two of the North Korean ships, for days. On 15 June, a North Korean torpedo boat opened fire at Chamsuri-class with grenades, rifles, and 25 mm cannons. The battle lasted for 14 minutes with South Korean victory; North Korea lost a torpedo boat and received 1 heavy damage, 2 moderate damage, and 2 minor damage on patrol boats among 10 ships. South Korea received minor damage on 4 Chamsuri-class and ROKS Cheonan. ROKS Jinhae, ROKS Cheonan, and ROKS Yeongju were involved in the incident. ROKS Yeongju scored critical hit and sunk the torpedo boat with OTO Melara 76 mm/62 cannon.

In 1999, the Batch IV began to equip RGM-84C Harpoon surface-to-surface missile. The system was taken out from decommissioning Chungbuk-class destroyers (ex-Gearing-class), and installed on the corvettes.

In 2000, MBDA Mistral MANPADS was installed on the ships as anti-air weapon.

On 29 June 2002, Chamsuri-class PKM-357 received surprise attack from North Korean patrol boat. ROKS Jinhae and ROKS Jecheon were dispatched to the scene to assist; the ships were under threat by Styx and Silkworm missile radars during the operation, and Mk 36 SRBOCs were used as the defensive measurement.

At the RIMPAC 2002, ROKS Wonju became the first Pohang-class to fire RGM-84C Harpoon. The missile hit the target successfully.

In 2006, K745 Blue Shark lightweight anti-submarine torpedo achieved full operating capability. The new torpedo will be added to arsenal of the corvettes.

On 29 September 2006, the Defense Acquisition Program Administration (DAPA) approved the batch 2 production of SSM-700K C-Star surface-to-surface missile for the year 2007 to 2010. The part of the production will be applied for the corvettes.

On 10 November 2009, ROKS Suncheon participated in the Battle of Daecheong to provide support to the Chamsuri-class patrol boats.

At 21:21:57 (12:21:57 UTC) of 26 March 2010, a North Korean submarine torpedoed ROKS Cheonan which was on routine patrol in the South Korean water. 46 sailors were killed in the ambush. The ship sank around 01:00 on 27 March 2010. The bow floated 6.4 kilometres (3.5 nmi) to the southeast from the explosion site, then submerged completely at 22:30 on 27 March 2010.

On 20 May 2010, a South Korean-led investigation group announced that all evidence pointed to a North Korean torpedo being responsible for the sinking of ROKS Cheonan.

As a response to the North Korean submarine attack, Pohang-class upgraded its anti-submarine warfare capability by installing SLQ-261K TACM (Torpedo Acoustic Counter Measure) and changing older rescue boat to RIB (Rigid-hulled Inflatable Boat) on Batch IV and later variants as early as 2012.

On 23 March 2014, the development of STX Engine SPS-300K surface search radar, which can detect small objects such as submarine periscope, was announced after being tested on ROKS Iksan. Additional 15 corvettes (Batch IV - VI) will receive the new radar by 2015.

In June 2019, ROKS Andong completed the test of SLQ-201K ESM (electronic support measures). The ESM detects electromagnetic waves emitted from the hostile missile and radar, allowing to track, analyze, identify, then warn the main system to automatically activate defensive measures such as Mk 36 SRBOC. All operating corvettes will receive the upgrade by 2020.

On 17 February 2020, BRP Conrado Yap encountered the People's Liberation Army Navy Type 056A corvette Liupanshui on its patrol mission. Crews of the Conrado Yap visually observed Liupanshui's gun control director pointing at them.

On 17 July 2022, fire erupted in the engine room of BAP Guise and injured 2 Peruvian sailors during RIMPAC 2022. With help from the French Navy and the U.S. Navy, the wounded sailors quickly received treatment and were hospitalized in Honolulu in stable condition. The fire was extinguished after 5 hours and 40 minutes. The reason for the fire is currently unknown. The ship received significant maintenance programs including disassembly and regeneration of diesel and gas turbine engines before the transfer to the Peruvian Navy. The repairing of BAP Guise was completed in February 2023.

== Ships in class by country ==
=== Republic of Korea Navy ===
Name	Hull Number	Builder	Launched	Delivered	Commissioned	Decommissioned	Status
Batch II
ROKS Pohang	PCC-756	Korea Shipbuilding Corporation	7 February 1984		31 October 1984	30 June 2009	Used as a museum ship in Pohang since 12 June 2010.
ROKS Gunsan	PCC-757	Korea Tacoma Shipyard	27 May 1984	30 November 1984	17 December 1984	29 September 2011	Scrapped in 2017.
ROKS Gyeongju	PCC-758	Hyundai Heavy Industries	29 May 1984	30 April 1985	1 May 1985	30 December 2014	Transferred to the Peruvian Coast Guard but currently in service with the Peruvian Navy as BAP Ferré.
ROKS Mokpo	PCC-759	Daewoo Shipbuilding	12 October 1984	17 May 1985	17 May 1985	30 December 2014	Disposed as a target ship during Tiger Shark torpedo test fire in 2018.
Batch III
ROKS Gimcheon	PCC-761	Korea Shipbuilding Corporation	29 November 1985	31 August 1986	1 September 1986	31 December 2015	Transferred to the Vietnam People's Navy as Ship 18.
ROKS Chungju	PCC-762	Korea Tacoma Shipyard	24 January 1986	30 September 1986	30 November 1986	27 December 2016	Transferred to the Philippine Navy as BRP Conrado Yap (PS-39).
ROKS Jinju	PCC-763	Hyundai Heavy Industries	12 February 1986	29 October 1986	1 November 1986	27 December 2016	Transferred to the Egyptian Navy as ENS Shabab Misr.
ROKS Yeosu	PCC-765	Daewoo Shipbuilding	14 June 1986	30 November 1986	1 December 1986	27 December 2017	Transferred to the Vietnam People's Navy as Ship 20.
Batch IV
ROKS Jinhae	PCC-766	Korea Shipbuilding Corporation	18 March 1987	2 July 1988	30 September 1988	27 December 2017	Used as museum ship in Jinhae since 22 September 2023.
ROKS Suncheon	PCC-767	Korea Tacoma Shipyard	3 April 1987	31 July 1988	30 September 1988	24 December 2019	Transferred to the Peruvian Navy as CM-28 BAP Guise.
ROKS Iksan	PCC-768	Hyundai Heavy Industries	24 March 1987	13 September 1988	30 September 1988	27 December 2018	Transferred to the Colombian Navy as ARC Almirante Tono.
ROKS Wonju	PCC-769	Daewoo Shipbuilding	23 October 1987	29 September 1988	30 September 1988	31 December 2021	Used by the Naval Battle Training Group Eight as reserve & training ship.
ROKS Andong	PCC-771	Korea Shipbuilding Corporation	30 April 1987	7 November 1988	5 January 1989	31 December 2020	To be transferred to the Philippine Navy.
ROKS Cheonan	PCC-772	Korea Tacoma Shipyard	24 July 1987	30 December 1988	31 December 1988	11 June 2010	Sunk on 26 March 2010 by torpedo attack from the North Korea. Raised and used as a memorial ship.
ROKS Bucheon	PCC-773	Hyundai Heavy Industries	12 June 1987	30 December 1988	4 May 1989	31 March 2021	Used by the Naval Battle Training Group Eight as reserve & training ship. Offered but refused by the Indonesian Navy.
ROKS Seongnam	PCC-775	Daewoo Shipbuilding	11 December 1987	3 May 1989	4 May 1989	31 December 2021	Used by the Naval Battle Training Group Eight as reserve & training ship.
ROKS Jecheon	PCC-776	Korea Tacoma Shipyard	8 December 1987	3 May 1989	4 May 1989	31 December 2021	Transferred to the Vietnam People's Navy as Ship 21.
ROKS Daecheon	PCC-777	Hyundai Heavy Industries	20 January 1988	28 April 1989	7 January 1990	28 December 2023	Used by the Naval Battle Training Group Eight as reserve & training ship.
Batch V
ROKS Sokcho	PCC-778	Hyundai Heavy Industries	7 July 1989	28 February 1990	2 March 1990	30 December 2022	Used by the Naval Battle Training Group Eight as reserve & training ship.
ROKS Yeongju	PCC-779	Hyundai Heavy Industries	27 July 1989	31 March 1990	20 April 1990	30 December 2022	Used by the Naval Battle Training Group Eight as reserve & training ship.
ROKS Namwon	PCC-781	Daewoo Shipbuilding	17 October 1988	30 April 1990	1 May 1990	28 December 2023	Used by the Naval Battle Training Group Eight as reserve & training ship.
ROKS Gwangmyeong	PCC-782	Korea Tacoma Shipyard	27 October 1989	30 June 1990	9 July 1990	31 December 2025	Used by the Naval Battle Training Group Eight as reserve & training ship.
Batch VI
ROKS Sinseong	PCC-783	Hanjin Heavy Industries	16 April 1991	28 March 1992			Active
ROKS Gongju	PCC-785	Korea Tacoma Shipyard	21 September 1992	31 July 1993			Active

=== Foreign operators ===
Name	Hull Number	Batch	Delivered	Commissioned	Status	Notes
Colombian National Navy
ARC Almirante Tono	CM-56	IV	28 September 2020	6 January 2021	Active	2 x Breda DARDO replaced by 2 x Sea Vulcan 2 x 2 RGM-84C Harpoon replaced by 2 x 2 SSM-700K C-Star
Egyptian Navy
ENS Shabab Misr	1000	III	19 September 2017		Active	2 x triple Mark 32 SVTT removed
Peruvian Navy
BAP Ferré	CM-27	II	2018	2018	Active	2 x MM38 Exocet removed
BAP Guise	CM-28	IV	26 November 2021	5 January 2022	Active	2 x 2 RGM-84C Harpoon removed but maintains rack
Philippine Navy
BRP Conrado Yap	PS-30	III	5 August 2019	5 August 2019	Active	Number changed from PS-39 to PS-30
(ex-ROKS Andong)	PS-40	IV			Due	
Vietnam People's Navy
VPNS 18		III	28 May 2017		Active	1 x OTO Melara 76 mm/62 (rear) removed 1 x Breda DARDO (front) replaced by 1 x Sea Vulcan 2 x triple Mark 32 SVTT removed Fitted with 2 x 4 VCM-01M
VPNS 20		III	17 October 2018		Active	Fitted with 2 x 4 VCM-01M
VPNS 21		IV	21 December 2025		Active	

== See also ==
- Ulsan-class frigate
- Donghae-class corvette
- Sukanya-class patrol vessel: Based on the Pohang-class
