= Combined diesel or gas =

Compression-ignition engine plus turbine connected to one drive shaft

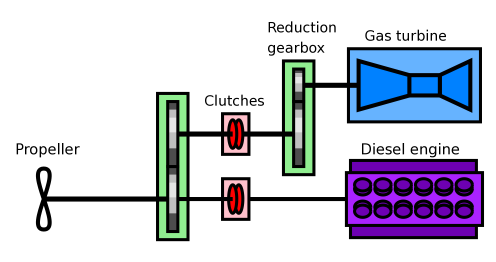
Principle of a CODOG arrangement

Combined diesel or gas (CODOG) is a type of propulsion system for ships that need a maximum speed that is considerably faster than their cruise speed, particularly warships like modern frigates or corvettes.

== System ==
Combined marine propulsion

Combined diesel or gas (CODOG)
Combined diesel and gas (CODAG)
Combined diesel-electric and diesel (CODLAD)
Combined diesel–electric and gas (CODLAG)
Combined diesel and diesel (CODAD)
Combined steam and gas (COSAG)
Combined gas or gas (COGOG)
Combined gas and gas (COGAG)
Combined gas and steam (COGAS)
Combined nuclear and steam propulsion (CONAS)
Integrated electric propulsion (IEP or IFEP)

For every propeller shaft there is one diesel engine for cruising speed and one geared gas turbine for high speed dashes. Both are connected to the shaft with clutches; only one system is driving the ship, in contrast to combined diesel and gas (CODAG) systems that can use the combined power output of both. The advantage of CODOG is a simpler gearing compared to CODAG, but it needs either more powerful or additional gas turbines to achieve the same maximum power output. The disadvantage of CODOG is that the fuel consumption at high speed is poor compared to CODAG.

== CODOG vessels ==
- MGB 2009, a modified Motor Gun Boat of the Royal Navy (1947), and
- The two German torpedo boats Pfeil and Strahl (Vosper class, 1963-65)
- The US Navy Asheville-class gunboats (built 1966-1971)
- The US Coast Guard Hamilton-class cutters (from 1967)
- Halifax-class frigates of the Royal Canadian Navy
- Bremen-class frigates, and
- Brandenburg-class frigates of the German Navy
- Gregorio del Pilar-class frigates of the Philippine Navy
- Anzac-class frigates of the Royal Australian Navy (RAN) and Royal New Zealand Navy (RNZN)
- other MEKO type frigates or corvettes
- Peder Skram-class frigates of the Royal Danish Navy
- Pohang-class corvettes of the South Korean Navy
- Visby-class corvettes of the Swedish Navy
- Shivalik-class frigates of the Indian Navy
- Niterói-class frigates of the Brazilian Navy
- BNS Bangabandhu of the Bangladesh Navy
- Gepard-class frigates of the Russian and Vietnamese Navies
- 118 WallyPower, luxury yacht
- Type 052D destroyers of the Chinese Navy

== Bibliography ==
- Friedman, Norman (1993). "Propulsion". In Gardiner, Robert & Friedman, Norman (eds.). Navies in the Nuclear Age. London: Conway Maritime Press. pp. 199–210. ISBN 1-55750-613-2.
