= Pecos =

Pecos may refer to:

== Places ==
- Pecos River, rises near Santa Fe, New Mexico, United States
- Pecos, Texas, a city in Reeves County, Texas, United States
- Pecos County, Texas, named for the Pecos River
  - Pecos Spring, a spring
- Pecos, New Mexico, a village, United States
- Pecos National Historical Park, a National Historical Park in the U.S. state of New Mexico
- Trans-Pecos, a region of Texas, United States

== Ships ==
- USS Pecos, the name of two ships of the United States Navy
- USNS Pecos (T-AO-197), a U.S. Navy fleet replenishment oiler in service since 1989

== Other uses ==
- Pecos Bill, a mythical American cowboy
- Pecos Classification, a division of all known Ancient Pueblo Peoples culture into chronological phases
- Pecos League, an independent professional baseball league headquartered in Houston
- Oryx/Pecos, a proprietary operating system developed by Bell Labs beginning in 1978, consisting of a kernel (Oryx) and the associated processes running on top of it (Pecos)
- PECOS (Programa Educativo de COlegios Secundarios), an Argentine computer

=== Pecos Smith ===
Character in:

- The Gun Packer, 1919 silent western
- hero of the Zane Grey novel West of the Pecos and its film adaptations:
  - West of the Pecos, 1934 film
  - West of the Pecos, 1945 film
- The Chinese Paymaster, 1967 novel

== See also ==
- Pecos Bill (disambiguation)
- Peco (disambiguation)
