= Military Sealift Command Japan =

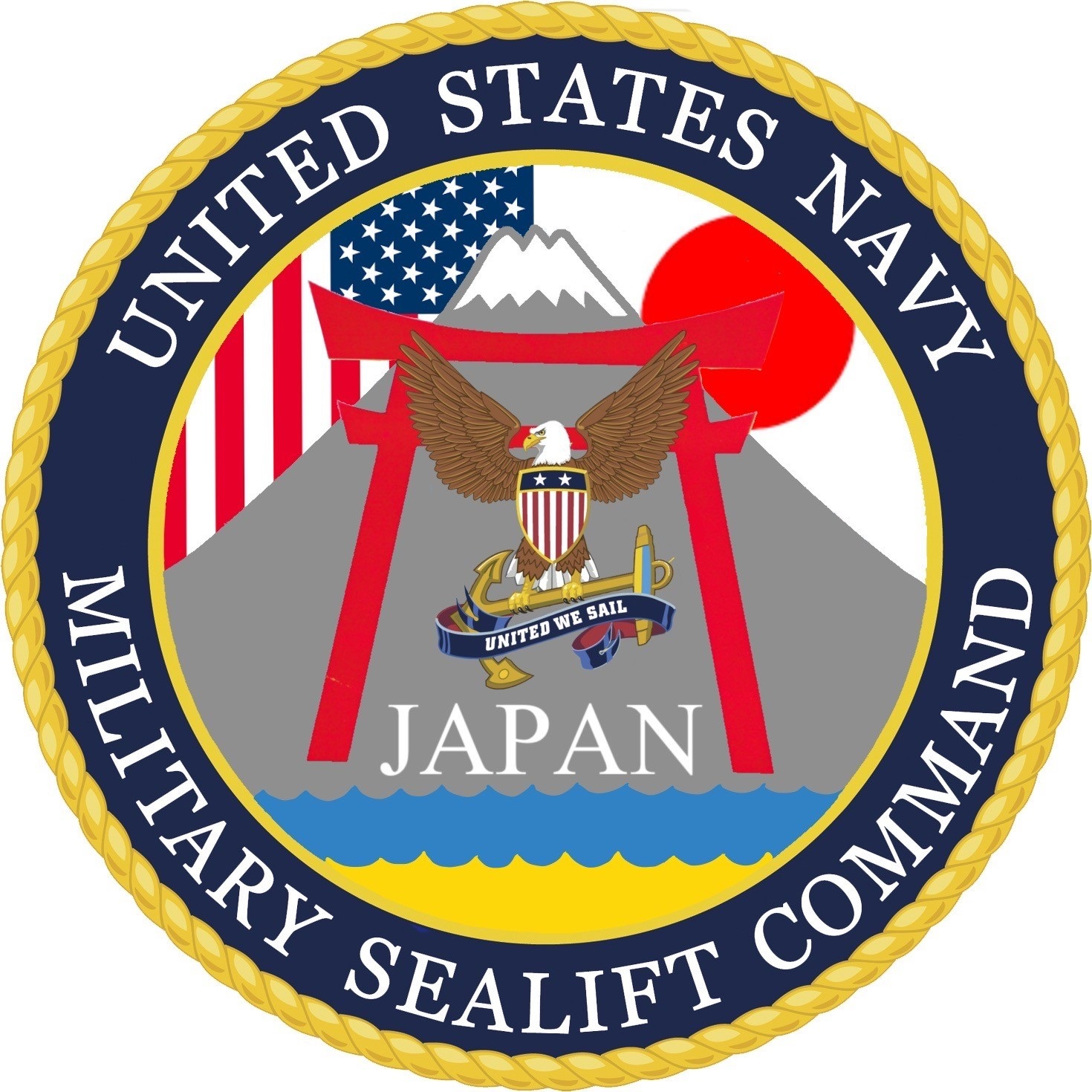
- Active: July 2006 - Present
- Country: United States
- Branch: United States Navy
- Type: Installation Command / Ship Support Unit

Military Sealift Command Japan (MSC Japan) (軍事海上輸送司令部 (MSC) 日本) is an Echelon IV Command of the United States Navy responsible for training, equipping and maintaining Military Sealift Command's government-owned, government-operated sealift ships throughout the country of Japan. Headquartered in Yokohama at Yokohama North Dock and co-located with the US Army 836th Transportation Battalion, MSC Japan is Commanded by an Active Duty Naval Officer and staffed with the following organizational Departments: N1 (Administration), N3 (Operations/Port Operations), N4 (Logistics), N6 (Information & Technology Support), N7 (Port Engineer), N8 (Accounting), and N10 (Contract Support). MSC Japan operates two warehouses, one at North Dock (MSC's largest overseas warehouse) and one in Sasebo, Japan. These facilities provide logistics support for all MSC units operating within the Pacific theater.

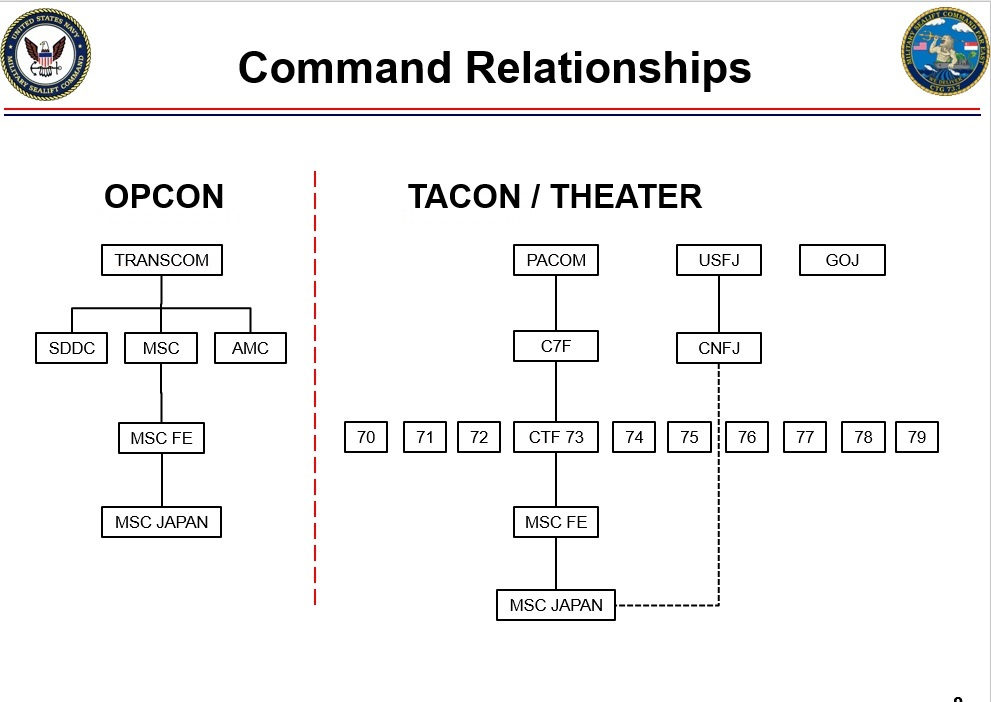
MSC Japan Command Relationships

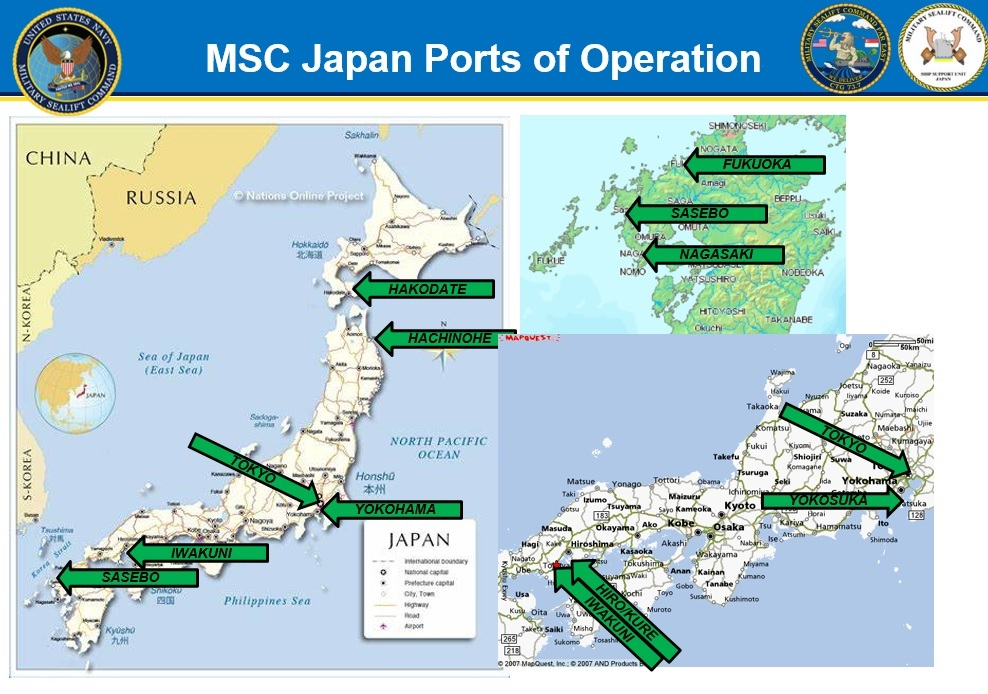
MSC Japan Ports of Operation

MSC Japan provides port installation services as well as manages all repair maintenance availabilities for MSC units throughout Japan, including Quarterly Voyage Repairs (VRs) (lasting approx. 2 week-1 month duration), Mid-Term Availabilities (length of availability depends on the repair work needed, but is required for MSC units approx. every 15 months), and Regular Overhauls (ROHs) (required for MSC ships every 5 years).

For Operational Chain-of-Command, MSC Japan reports to MSC Far East (MSC FE) Headquartered in Singapore and via competency alignment with Military Sealift Command Headquarters (COMSC) in Norfolk, Virginia.

Timeline of MSC Japan:

- July 1950: Established as MSC’s first office in the Pacific. Originally named Military Sea Transportation Service, Western Pacific (MSTWP) to support the Korean War
- November 1955 - April 1975: MSTWP provided logistical support for the Vietnam War
- August 1970: Renamed Military Sealift Command Far East (MSC FE)
- August 1990 - January 1991: MSC FE provided support to the MSC Fleet and US Fleet during the Gulf War
- July 2006: Established MSC Japan as a ship support unit while MSC’s global transformation moved MSC FE to Sebawang Wharves in Singapore
- March 2011: MSC Japan ship support unit provided support as a command & control (C2) coordination center for MSC's participation in Operation Tomodachi following the 11 March 2011 Tohoku Earthquake, Tsunami, and Nuclear disaster. Military Sealift Command ships also took part in the operation by transferring relief supplies and fuel to other supporting ships. The ships that took part in the operation were USNS Carl Brashear (T-AKE 7), USNS Pecos (T-AO 197), USNS Rappahannock (T-AO 204), USNS Matthew Perry (T-AKE 9), USNS Bridge (T-AOE 10).
- August 2020: Previous civilian Director position changed to a Military Officer (O-4/O-5) Surface Warfare Officer billet.

Notable previous Commanders in Yokohama include,

- CAPT Thomas G. Kelley, USN (Ret.) (as Commander Military Sealift Command Far East)
