= Operation Pacific Assist =

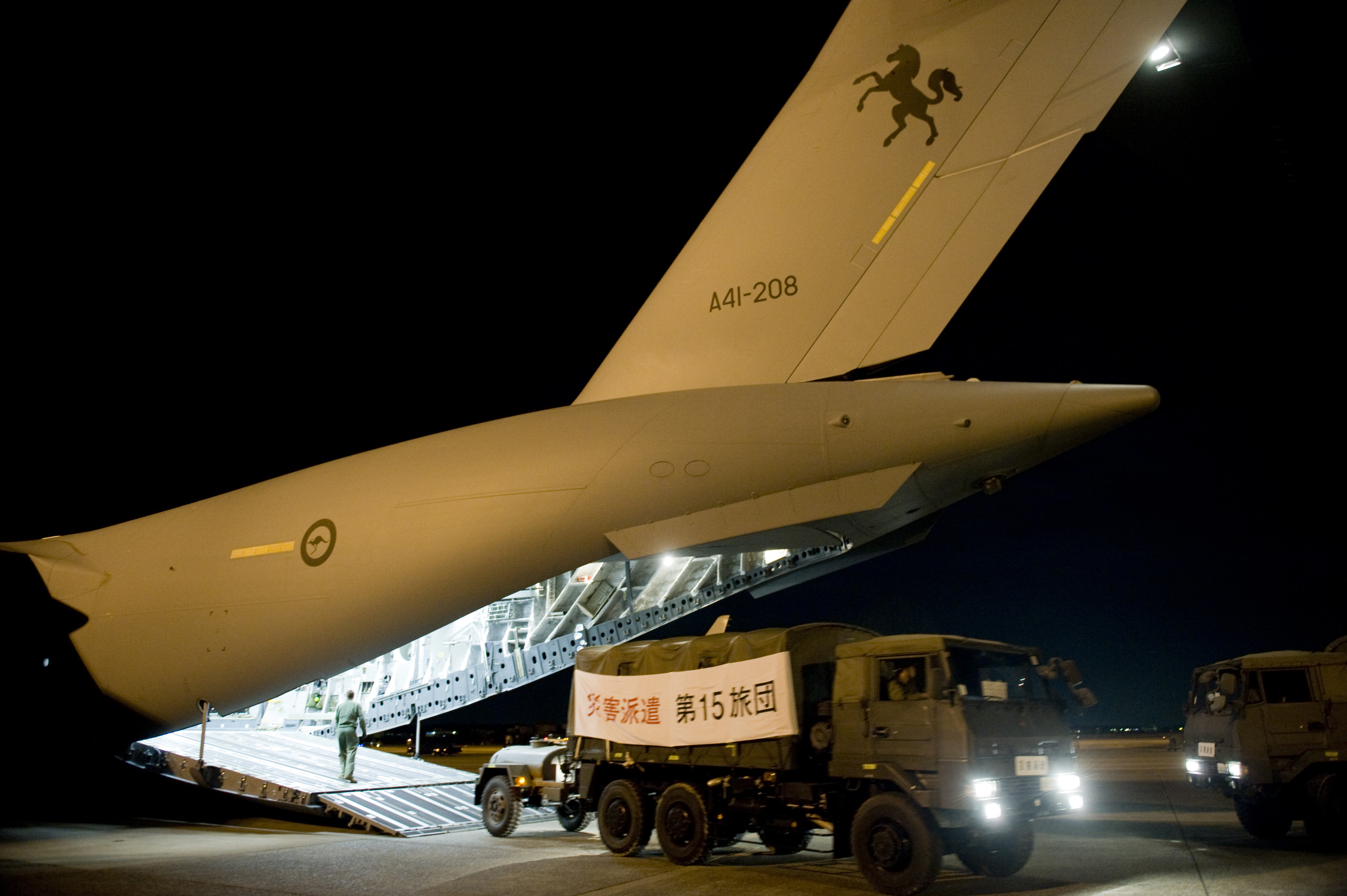
- 15th Brigade vehicles unloading from C-17 at Yokota Air Base
- Type: Emergency Relief Operation
- Location: Japan
- Commanded by: ADF & NZDF
- Objective: Earthquake victim relief (transportation support)
- Date: March 14, 2011 – March 25, 2011

Operation Pacific Assist was an operation commenced by Australian Defence Force and New Zealand Defence Force together with Emergency Management Australia and Emergency Management New Zealand as an effort to support the relief activity on the aftermath of the 2011 Tōhoku earthquake and tsunami and Fukushima Daiichi nuclear disaster which occurred in Japan. Royal Australian Air Force (RAAF) and Royal New Zealand Air Force (RNZAF) deployed C-17A Globemaster III aircraft onto the transportation support activity.

== Summary ==
Prior to the Queensland floods and Christchurch earthquake, an Emergency Services Task Force was created by emergency response personnel from Sydney, Canberra and Brisbane in Australia, and there is also the emergency response personnel from Auckland and Wellington in New Zealand. On March 14, 2011, RAAF and RNZAF are transported the Task Force into Yokota Air Base with a C-17A.

The C-17A then remain in Japan to provide transportation help for Japanese and American government, includes for example, transporting vehicles and personnel of 15th Brigade of Japan Ground Self-Defence Force from Kadena Air Base in Okinawa to Yokota Air Base, and transporting drinking water from Chitose Air Base to Hanamaki Airport. These operations are also helped by United States Forces Japan.

On March 22, 2011, in order to help with containing the Fukushima Daiichi nuclear disaster, two additional C-17A carrying water cannon system were sent to Japan. At that point, three out of the four C-17s operated by the RAAF and RNZAF were sent to Japan.

Operation Pacific Assist ended on March 25, 2011. During the operation, 23 sorties were commenced, transporting more than a million pounds of cargo, including 41 vehicles and 135 personnel.

== See also ==
- Operation Tomodachi
- 2011 Tōhoku earthquake and tsunami
- Aftermath of the 2011 Tōhoku earthquake and tsunami
- List of cities and towns severely damaged by the 2011 Tōhoku earthquake and tsunami
- Humanitarian response to the 2011 Tōhoku earthquake and tsunami
- Fukushima Daiichi nuclear disaster
- International reactions to the Fukushima Daiichi nuclear disaster
- Japan-Australia relations
- Japan-New Zealand relations
