= Pecco (disambiguation) =

Pecco is a village in the Metropolitan City of Turin in the Italian region Piedmont.

Pecco may also refer to:

- Renzo Pecco, an Italian surgeon and professor
- Orange pecco, a tea
- Francesco Bagnaia, an Italian motorcycle racer, nicknamed Pecco

== See also ==
- Peko
- Peco (disambiguation)
