= ROKS Bucheon =

Pohang-class corvette

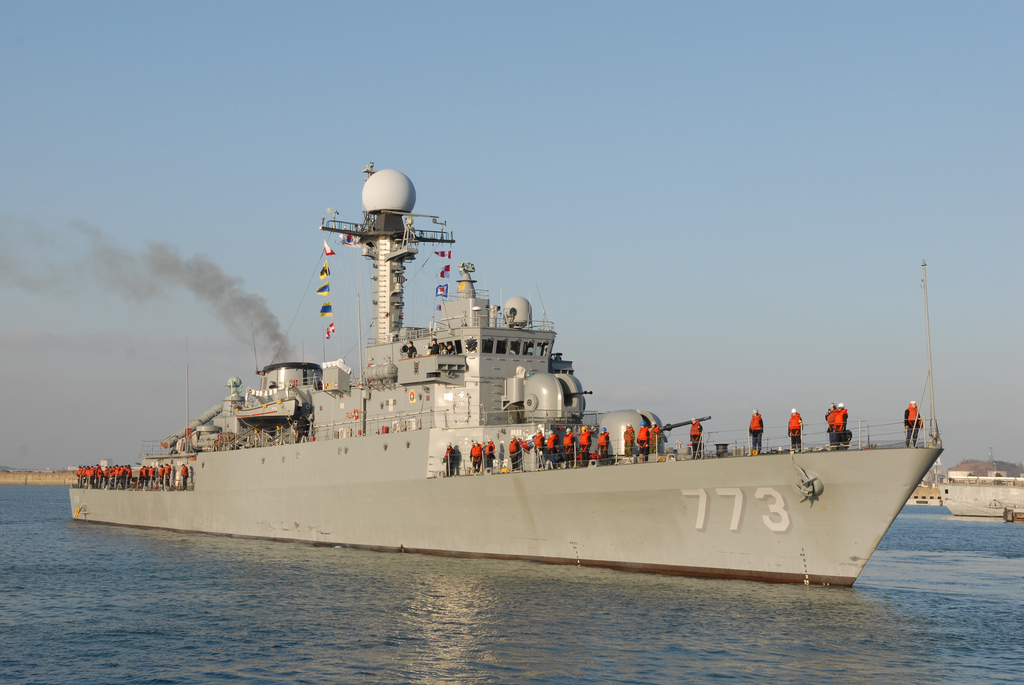
- ROKS Bucheon on 11 July 2012

History

South Korea
- Name: Bucheon; (부천)
- Namesake: Bucheon
- Builder: Hyundai, Ulsan
- Launched: 30 December 1988
- Commissioned: 4 May 1989
- Decommissioned: 25 March 2021
- Identification: Pennant number: PCC-773
- Status: Decommissioned

General characteristics
- Class & type: Pohang-class corvette
- Displacement: 1,220 tons
- Length: 289.7 ft (88 m)
- Beam: 33 ft (10 m)
- Draft: 2.9 ft (0.88 m)
- Installed power: 2 × MTU 6V396 TC52 diesel generators
- Propulsion: Combined diesel or gas (CODOG) arrangement: 2 × MTU 12V956 TB82 diesel engines producing combined total of 6,260 shp (4,670 kW); 1 × General Electric LM2500 PB gas turbines generating 27,820 shp (20,700 kW)
- Speed: 32 knots (59 km/h; 37 mph) maximum
- Range: 4,000 nmi (7,400 km; 4,600 mi) at 15 knots (28 km/h; 17 mph) using diesel engines
- Endurance: 20 days
- Boats & landing craft carried: 2 × RHIB
- Crew: 118
- Sensors & processing systems: X-band & S-band navigational radars; Raytheon AN/SPS-64(V)5B surface search radar; Signaal (Thales Nederland) WM-28 Fire Control System; Signaal (Thales Nederland) LIOD optronic director; Raytheon AN/SQS-58 hull mounted passive/active sonar
- Electronic warfare & decoys: 2 × Loral Hycor Mk 34 RBOC Chaff and Decoy Launching System
- Armament: 2 × Oto Melara 76 mm/62 caliber Compact naval guns; 2 × Otobreda 40mm L/70 twin naval guns; 2 × Mk 32 triple torpedo tubes; 2 × Mk 9 Depth Charge Racks; 6 × M2HB Browning .50 caliber machine guns

ROKS Bucheon (PCC-773) was a Pohang-class corvette of the Republic of Korea Navy.

== Development and design ==
The Pohang class is a series of corvettes built by different Korean shipbuilding companies. The class consists of 24 ships and some after decommissioning were sold or given to other countries. There are five different types of designs in the class from Flight II to Flight VI.

== Construction and career ==
Bucheon was launched on 30 December 1988 by Hyundai Heavy Industries in Ulsan. The vessel was commissioned in 1990.

On 22 December 2016, USS Barry and ROKS Bucheon conducted an officer exchange program.

On 25 March 2021, was decommissioned at Jinhae military port.

Bucheon was one of the three Pohang-class corvettes that were proposed to be transferred to the Indonesian Navy in 2024. Talks on the matter continued as late as October 2025, and in February 2026 the proposal was cancelled by the House of Representatives of Indonesia.

== Gallery ==
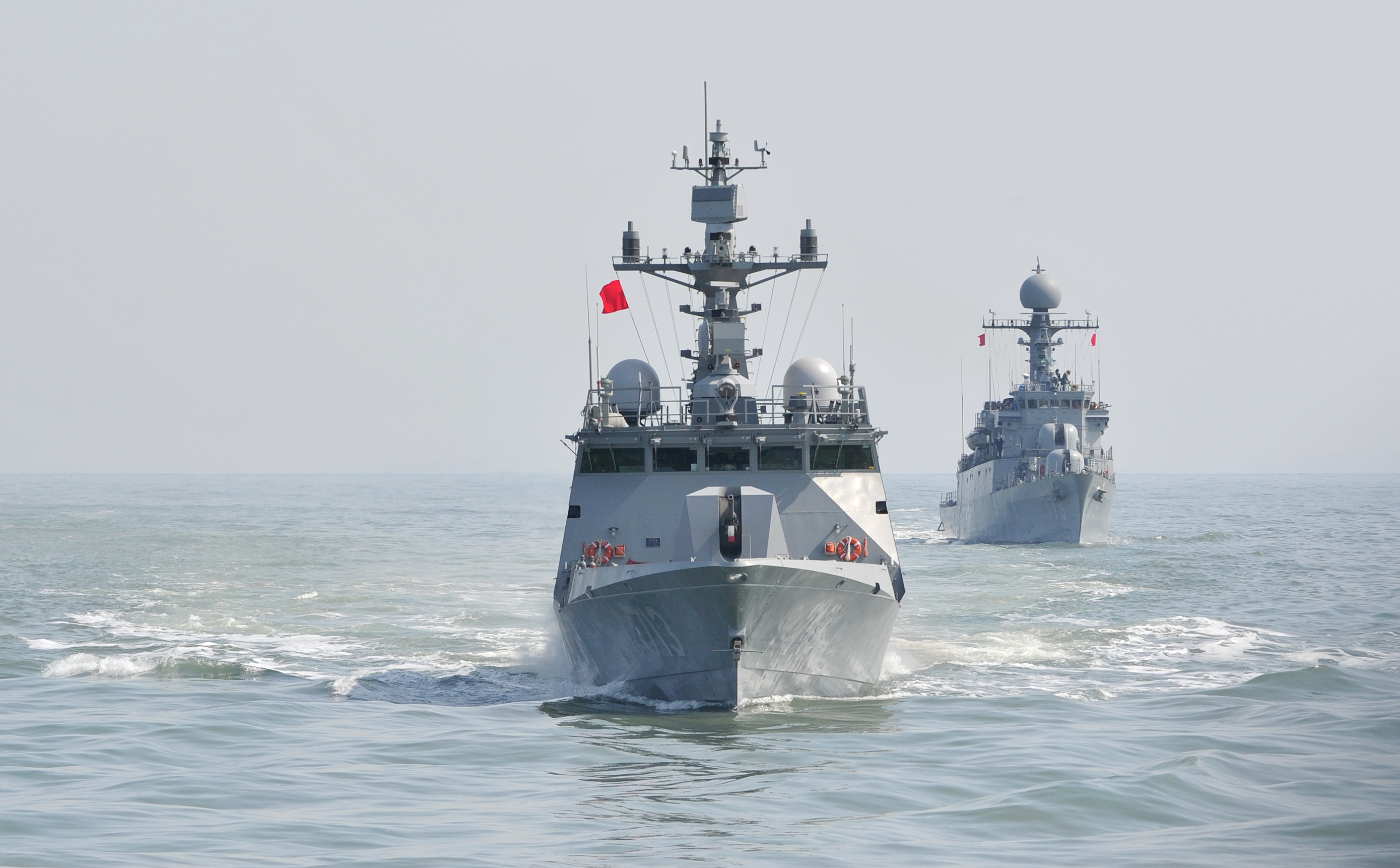
ROKS Bucheon and ROKS Jo Chunhyung on 21 March 2012.

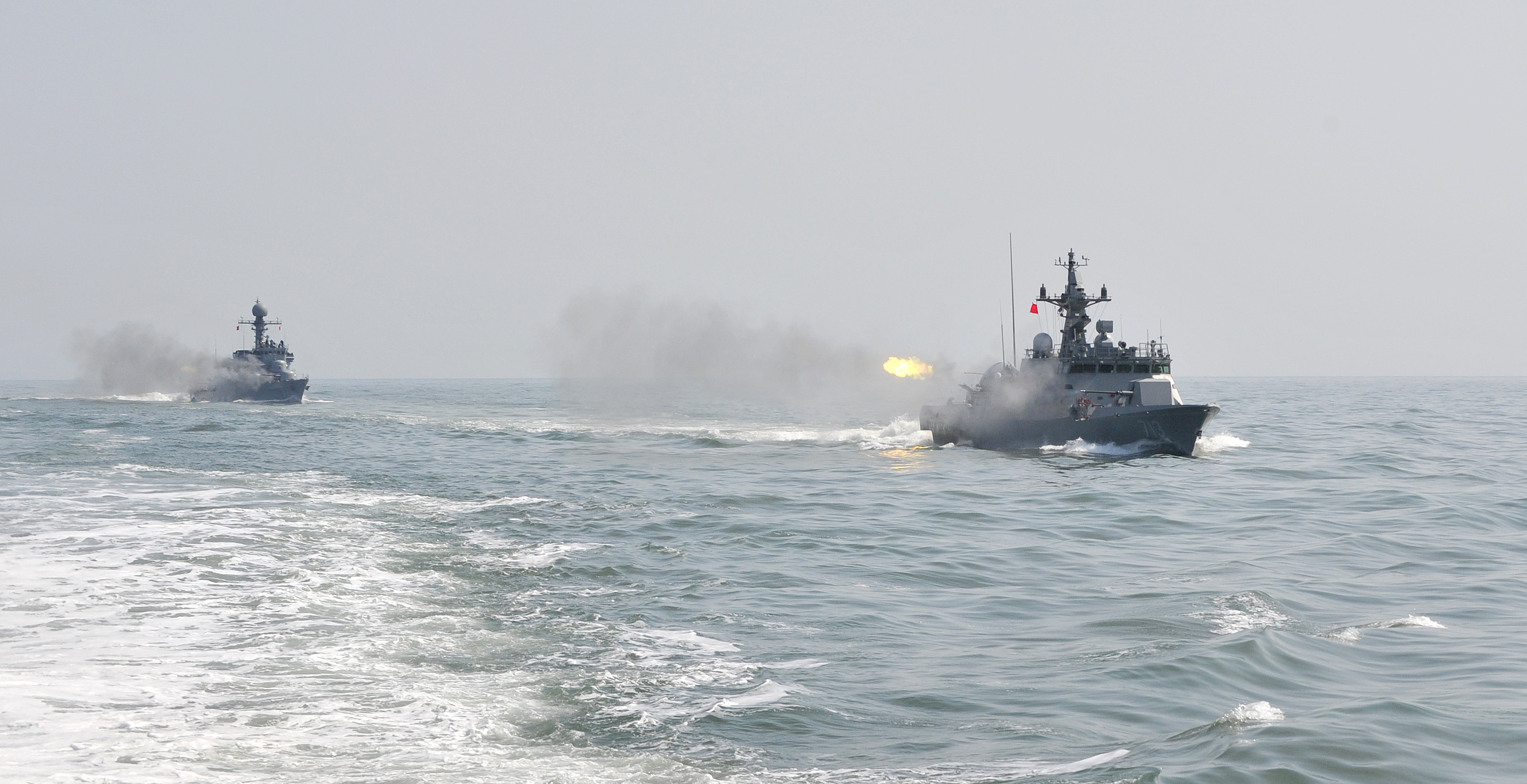
ROKS Bucheon and ROKS Jo Chunhyung on 21 March 2012.

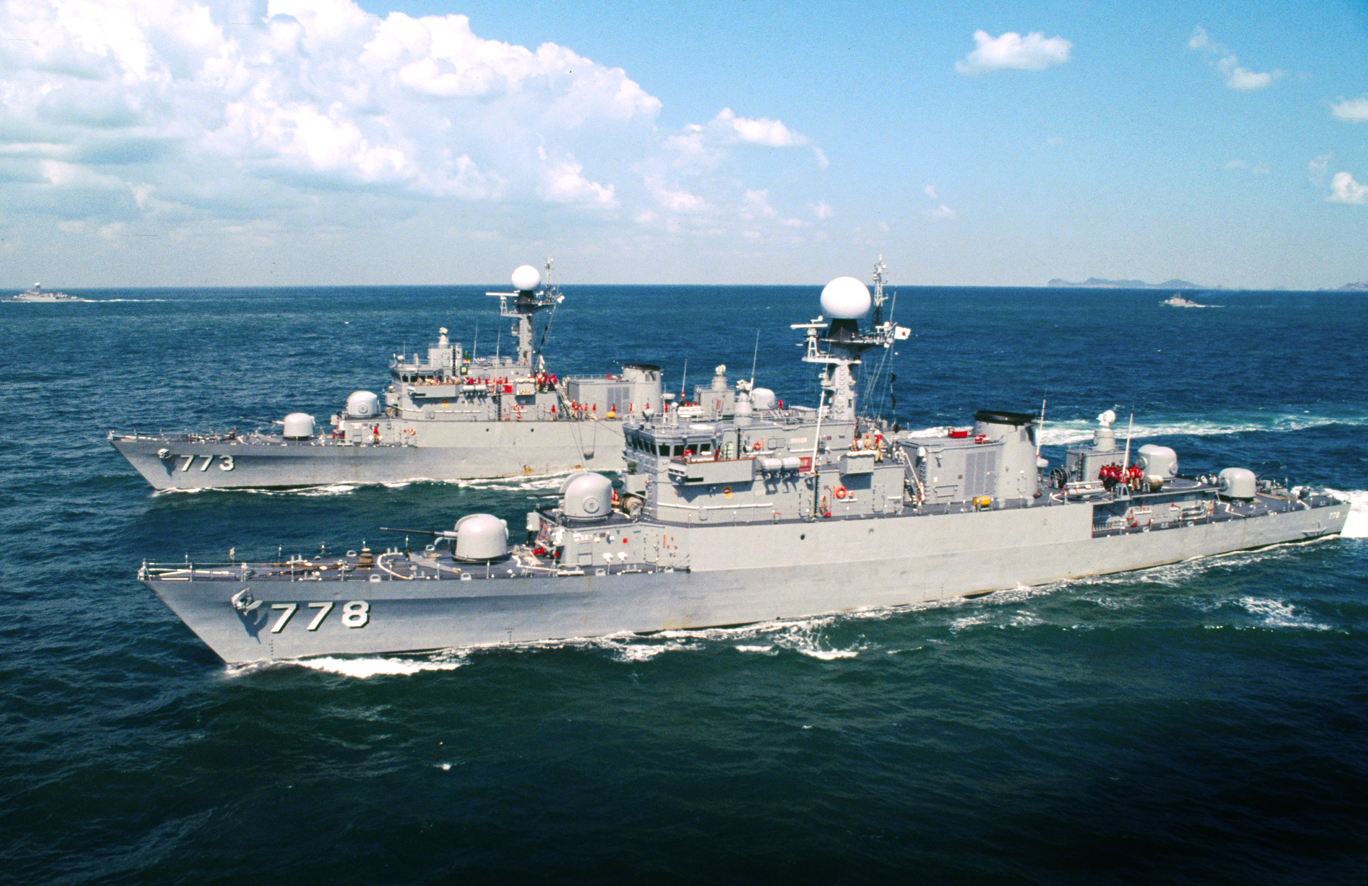
ROKS Bucheon and ROKS Sokcho on 11 May 2012.

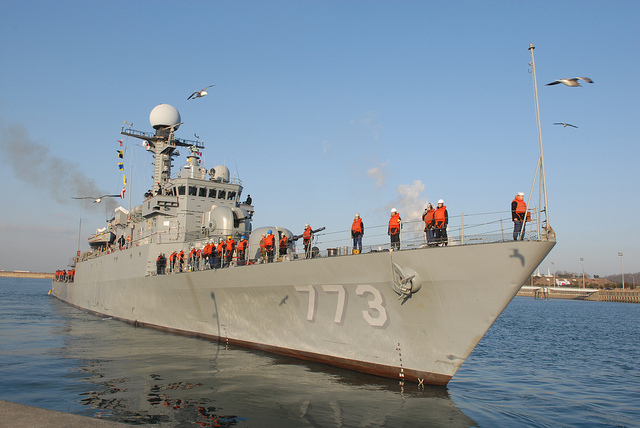
ROKS Bucheon on 11 July 2012.

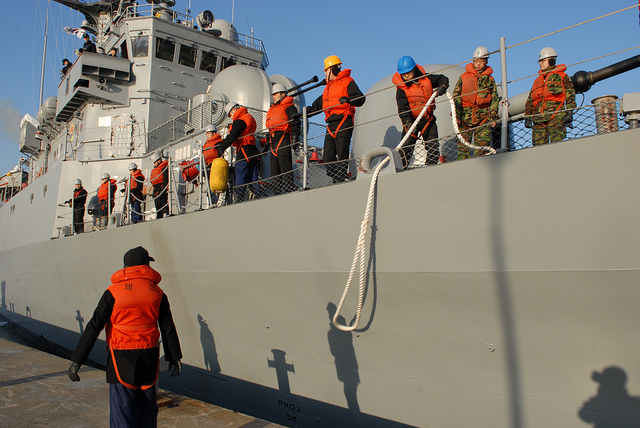
ROKS Bucheon on 11 July 2012.

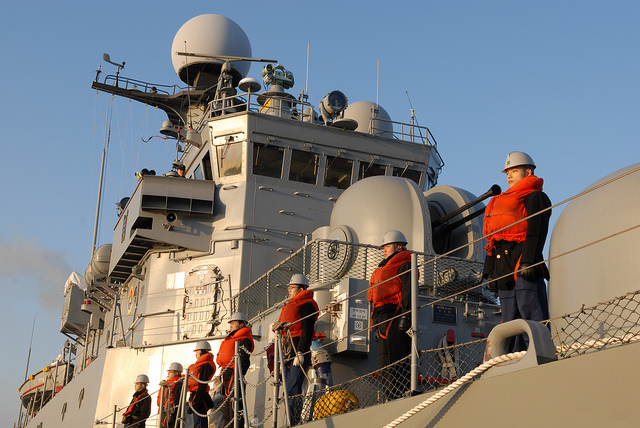
ROKS Bucheon on 11 July 2012.

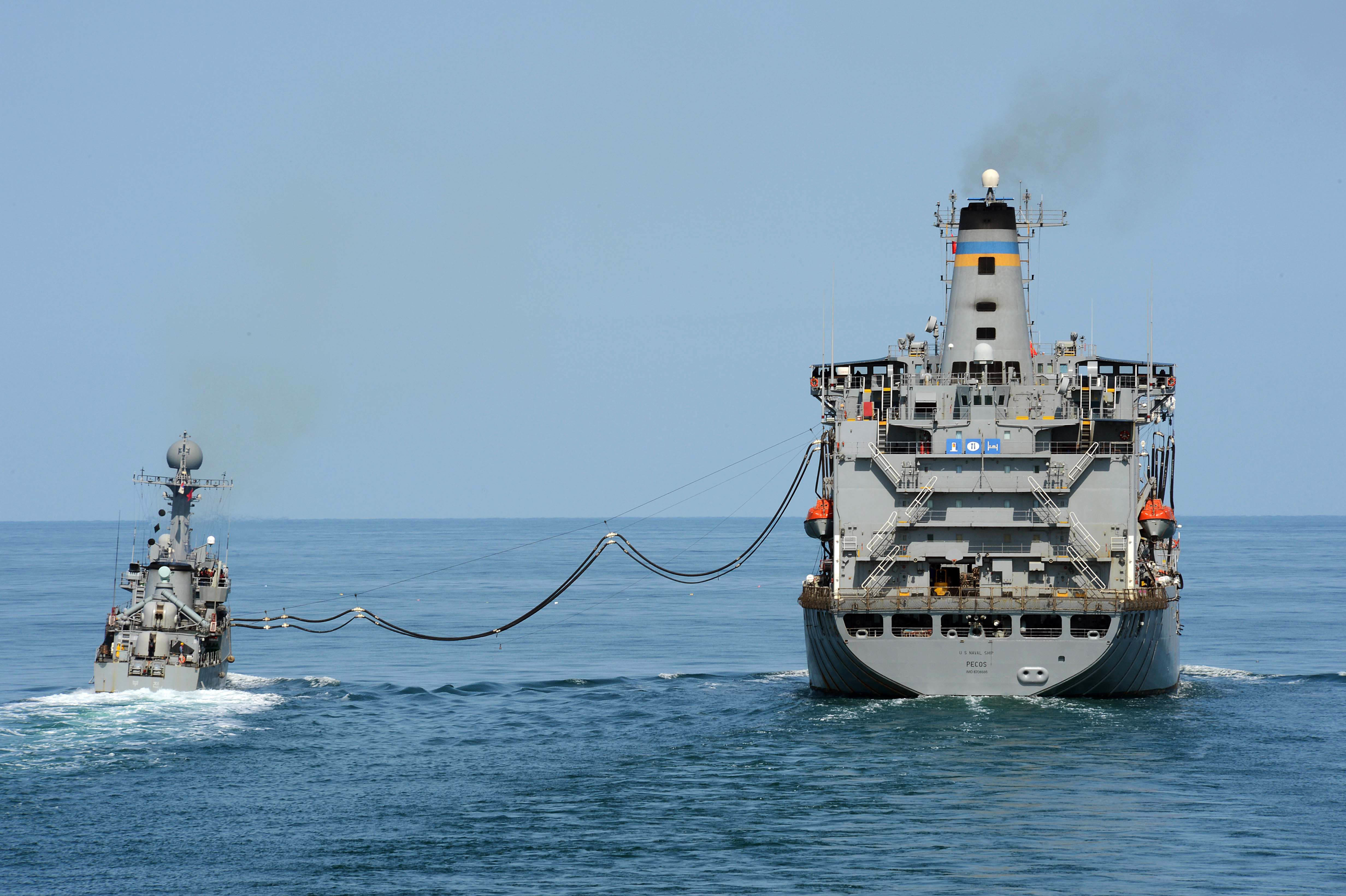
ROKS Bucheon replenish with USNS Pecos on 1 March 2013.
