= USS Pecos =

USS Pecos or USNS Pecos may refer to the following ships of the United States Navy, named for the Pecos River:

- USS Pecos (AO-6), a Kanawha-class fleet replenishment oiler, 1920–1942
- USS Pecos (AO-65), a Suamico-class fleet replenishment oiler, 1942–1946; with Military Sea Transportation Service as USNS Pecos (T-AO-65) from 1950; struck 1974
- USNS Pecos (T-AO-197), a U.S. Navy Henry J. Kaiser-class fleet replenishment oiler in service since 1989.

== See also ==
- Pecos (disambiguation)
