= ROKS Sokcho =

Pohang-class corvette

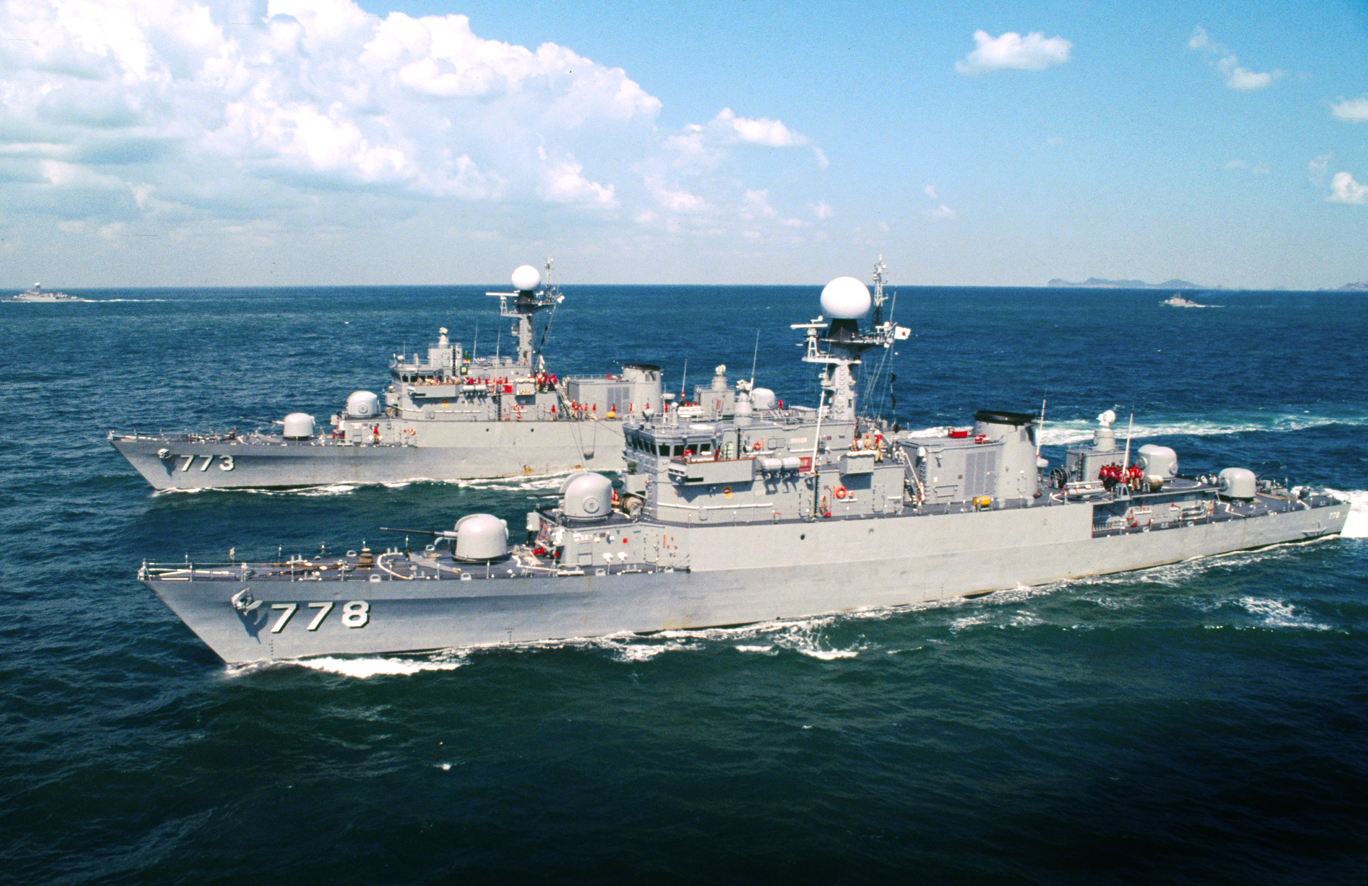
- ROKS Sokcho and Bucheon underway in 2007

History

South Korea
- Name: Sokcho (속초)
- Namesake: Sokcho
- Builder: Hyundai Heavy Industries Co., Ltd.; Ulsan, South Korea
- Launched: 7 July 1989
- Commissioned: 2 March 1990
- Decommissioned: 30 December 2022
- Identification: Hull number: PCC-778
- Status: Retired

General characteristics
- Class & type: Pohang-class corvette
- Displacement: 1,200 t (1,200 long tons)
- Length: 88 m (288 ft 9 in)
- Draft: 2.9 m (9 ft 6 in)
- Propulsion: CODOG unit
- Speed: Maximum 32 knots (59 km/h; 37 mph); Cruising 15 knots (28 km/h; 17 mph)
- Range: 4,000 nmi (7,400 km; 4,600 mi)
- Complement: 104
- Armament: 4 × Harpoon missiles, 2 × OTO Melara(76 mm)/62 compact cannon; 2 × Breda 40 mm/70 cannon; 6 × Mark 46 torpedoes; 12 × Mark 9 depth charges

ROKS Sokcho (PCC-778) is a South Korean Pohang-class corvette of the Republic of Korea Navy (ROKN). It was in the vicinity at the time of the sinking of ROKS Cheonan and is reported to have fired shots at a possible target that was identified by it at that time. Sokcho was decommissioned on 30 December 2022.

== Design ==
=== Armament ===
The ship's armament consists of:

- Boeing RGM-84 Harpoon missiles
- Two Otobreda 76 mm/62 compact guns (OTO Melara)
- Two Breda 40 mm/70 guns
- Six 12.75 in (324 mm) Mark 46 torpedoes
- Twelve Mark 9 depth charges
