= Peco (disambiguation) =

PECO is a British manufacturer of model railway accessories.

Peco or PECO may also refer to:

- PECO Energy Company, formerly the Philadelphia Electric Company, now a subsidiary of Exelon
- Panay Electric Company (PECO), an electric power distribution company in the Philippines
- Asim Peco, linguist
- Pakistan Engineering Company (PECO), an engineering company in Pakistan
- Photoelectrochemical oxidation, a process by which incident light enables a semiconductor material to promote a catalytic oxidation reaction
- Peco (model), Japanese model, television personality, and singer

== See also ==
- Pecos (disambiguation)
- Pecco (disambiguation)
