= Operation Tomodachi =

US earthquake relief operation for Japan

Operation Tomodachi トモダチ作戦
- Part of the response to 2011 Tōhoku earthquake and tsunami
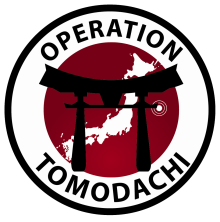
- Type: Emergency response
- Location: Earthquake and tsunami affected areas of Honshu, especially Tōhoku region (Fukushima, Iwate and Miyagi), Japan
- Objective: Search and rescue, disaster relief, humanitarian relief
- Date: 12 March 2011 – 4 May 2011
- Executed by: United States Forces Japan

Operation Tomodachi (Japanese: トモダチ作戦, Hepburn: Tomodachi Sakusen; lit. 'Operation Friend(s)') was a United States Armed Forces (especially U.S. Forces Japan) assistance operation to support Japan in disaster relief following the 2011 Tōhoku earthquake and tsunami. The operation took place from 12 March to 4 May 2011; involved 24,000 U.S. servicemembers, 189 aircraft, 24 naval ships; and cost $90 million.

== Bases and commands ==
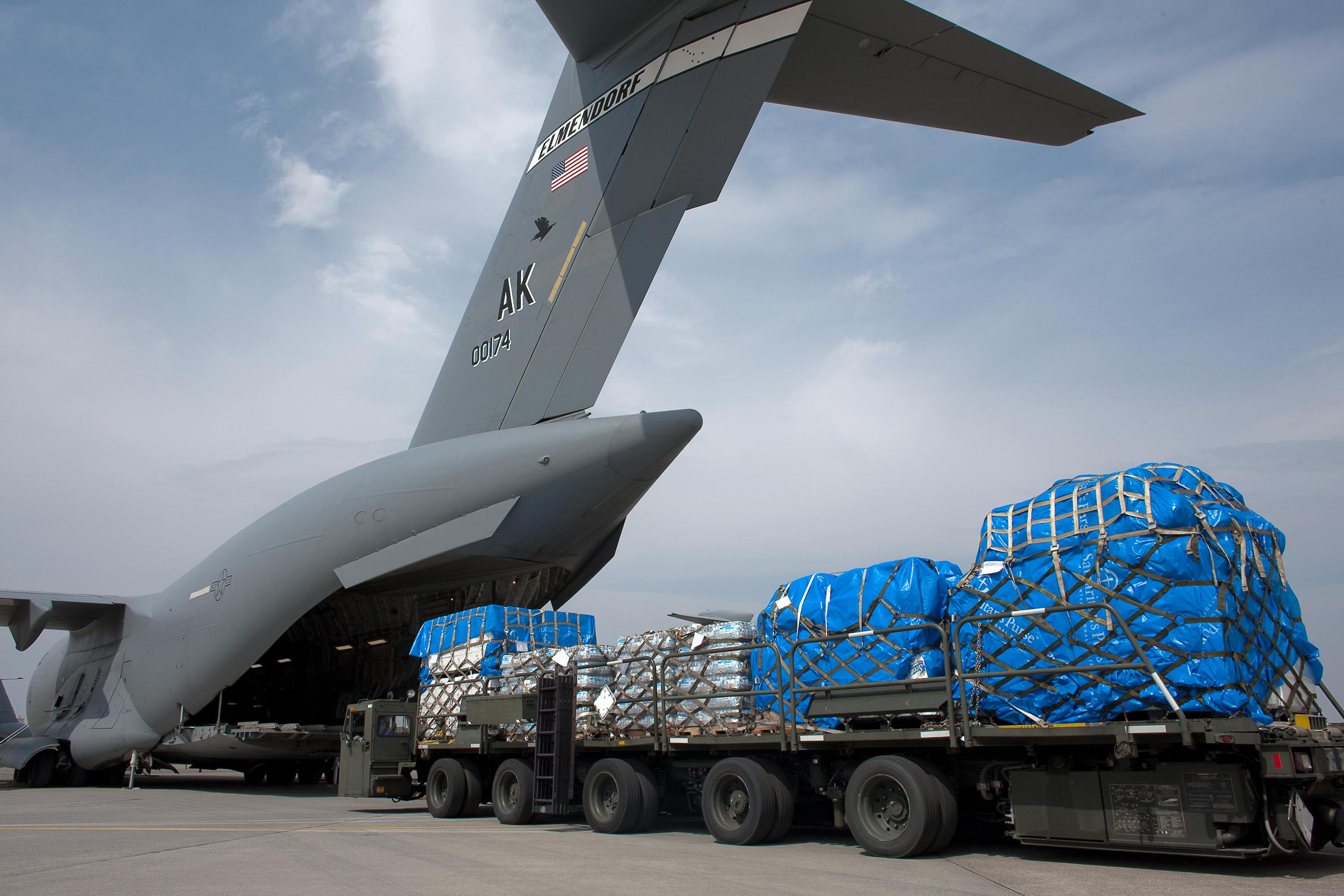
A C-17 Globemaster is loaded with food, water and blankets at Yokota

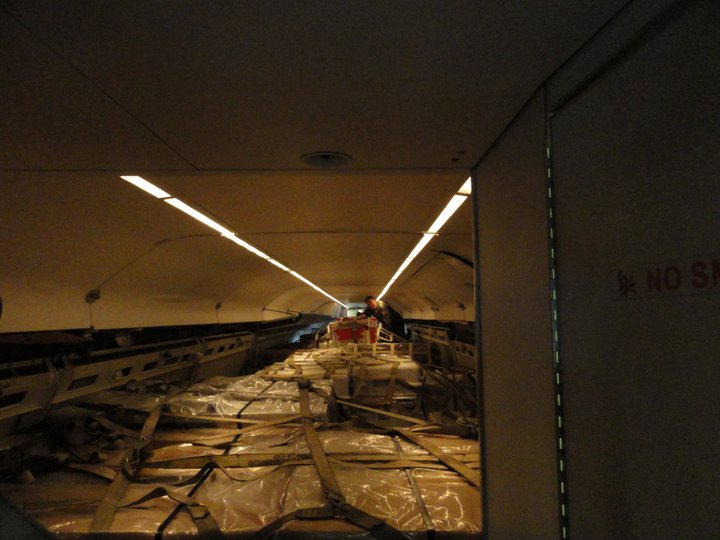
VR-52's C-9B loading cargo during Operation Tomodachi at NAF Atsugi.

Many, if not most, of the U.S. military bases in Japan were involved in some manner in Operation Tomodachi.

- Yokota Air Base in Fussa, western Tokyo, is the operational command center, and furthermore functions as the aviation hub due to the washout of the Sendai Airport, Miyagi by the tsunami.
- Kadena Air Base, Okinawa Prefecture is the hub of airpower in the Pacific.
- Military Sealift Command Japan, Yokohama, provided Command control and coordination of Military Sealift Command assets.
- Marine Corps Air Station Futenma
- Marine Corps Air Station Iwakuni, operated as an aviation hub for many aircraft traveling to northern installations.
- Camp Fuji
- Misawa Air Base, Aomori, combined services and Japan Self-Defense Forces
- Naval Air Facility Atsugi, Kanagawa Prefecture home of CVW-5 and Fleet Air Wing 4 of the JMSDF
- Camp Zama is the home of U.S. Army Japan and I Corps (Forward)
- Sasebo Naval Base in Nagasaki Prefecture, USS Essex (LHD-2) and its Expeditionary Strike Group.
- Yokosuka Naval Base inside of Tokyo Bay, is home to the Seventh Fleet, composed of 11 warships, including USS George Washington (CVN-73) and command ship USS Blue Ridge (LCC-19).
- Task Force Fuji, Camp Fuji Marines and sailors
- Camp Courtney, Okinawa, operated as the communications post between Okinawa and Japanese mainland

== Joint operations ==
Col. Stephen Bissonnette, deputy commander of the 353rd SOG stated that "[T]he devastation caused by the earthquake is truly heartbreaking...As part of coordinated relief efforts, the group will work tirelessly with our Japanese counterparts and other relief organizations to help the people affected by the earthquake recover..." The US aid efforts are conducted under the direction of Japanese government or military authorities.

=== Navy ===
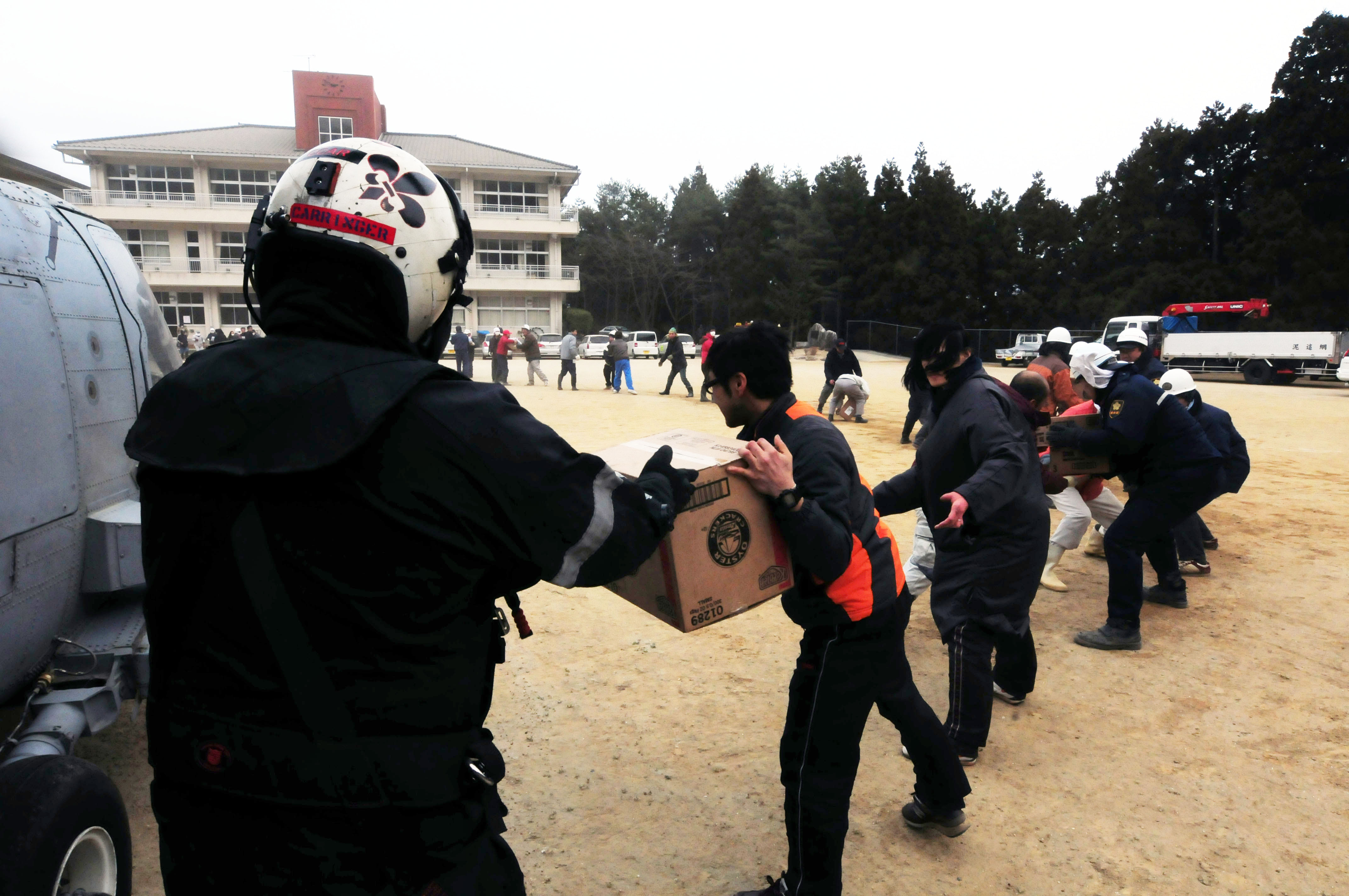
Japanese citizens form a human chain to unload supplies from a U.S. helicopter.

The United States Navy quickly responded to provide aid. Aircraft from three FLSW (Fleet logistic Support Wing) squadrons were in theatre during the earthquake at Naval Air Facility Atsugi. VR-62's C-130 delivered 127 tons of material to aid in relief efforts and VR-58's C-40 delivered 366,000 pounds of food and water and 1400 passengers. VR-52's aircrew and maintenance detachment moved Navy patrol and helicopter units directly involved with the search and rescue of survivors in addition to relocating 185 Navy personnel and dependents from the Atsugi-based Carrier Air Group Five to Guam. During this time, the Taskmasters were airborne for 19 out of 26 hours transporting personnel and humanitarian relief supplies. The aircraft carrier USS Ronald Reagan (CVN-76) and its battle group were moved to the east coast of Honshu. As well as the group's own helicopters, the Ronald Reagan served as a refueling platform for Japan Self-Defense Forces helicopters. C-2 Greyhound aircraft assigned to VRC-30 and attached to CVW-14 and CVW-5 ferried over 100 tons of food, water, blankets, clothing, and medical supplies from NAF Atsugi to USS Ronald Reagan for distribution by helicopter to local sites in Japan.

Yokota Air Base was used in the aftermath of the earthquake as a landing field for commercial flights as Tokyo Narita Airport was closed. The Navy helicopters based at Naval Air Facility Atsugi and elsewhere were made available for search and rescue immediately after the tsunami, including searching off-shore debris fields and later assisted with food drops. P-3 Orion aircraft were used to do damage surveys. Amphibious landing craft and utility landing craft (LCUs) were used to deploy U.S. and Japanese troops and supplies to areas where docks were damaged. Japan electrical company trucks were moved by U.S. LCUs from USS Essex (LHD-2), notably to Oshima Island.

The destroyers USS McCampbell (DDG-85) and USS Curtis Wilbur (DDG-54) were off the Bōsō Peninsula at the time of the earthquake, and their helicopters were made available for search and rescue. The landing ships USS Essex (LHD-2) and USS Germantown (LSD-42), with the embarked 31st Marine Expeditionary Unit from Okinawa, were moved from the Sea of Japan to the east coast of Japan.

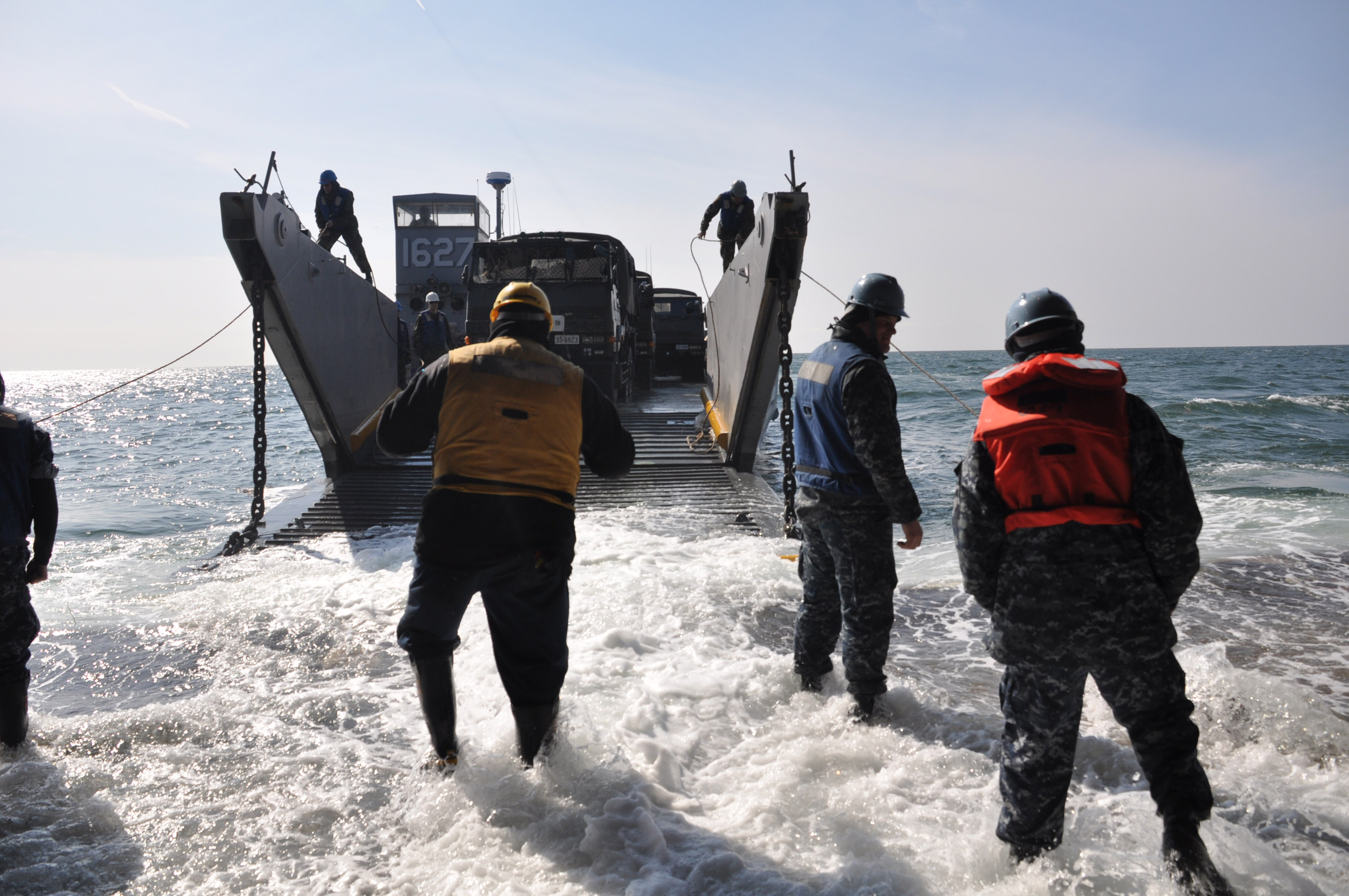
A U.S. landing craft moves Japan Defense Force vehicles

USS Blue Ridge (LCC-19), which had just arrived in Singapore at the time of the earthquake, was loaded with relief supplies and prepared to sail for Japan.

USS Tortuga (LSD-46), an amphibious dock ship, embarked two MH-53E Heavy Lift Helicopters assigned to HM-14 DET 1 stationed in Pohang South Korea. The entire DET was on board Tortuga less than 18 hours after the earthquake and tsunami hit. Tortuga transported 300 Japan Ground Self Defense Force personnel and 90 vehicles from Hokkaido to Honshu.

Military Sealift Command ships also took part in the operation by transferring relief supplies and fuel to other supporting ships. The ships that took part in the operation were USNS Carl Brashear (T-AKE 7), USNS Pecos (T-AO 197), USNS Rappahannock (T-AO 204), USNS Matthew Perry (T-AKE 9), USNS Bridge (T-AOE 10).

USNS Safeguard (T-ARS-50), which was stationed at U.S. Fleet Activities Sasebo, arrived at Hachinohe, Japan with Explosive Ordnance Disposal Mobile Unit 5 and Underwater Construction Team 2 to clear wreckage from a local commercial channel.

During the operation the 7th Fleet flew 160 search and relief sorties for 1,100 flight hours, delivered 260 tons of relief supplies, and helped clear the ports of Hachinohe, Aomori, Miyako, Iwate, and Kesennuma, Miyagi.

In total 130 aircraft, 12,510 personnel and over 16 American naval ships took part in Operation Tomodachi, including USS Ronald Reagan (CVN-76), USS Chancellorsville (CG-62), USS Cowpens (CG-63), USS Shiloh (CG-67), USS John S. McCain (DDG-56), USS Fitzgerald (DDG-62), USS Stethem (DDG-63), USS McCampbell (DDG-85), USS Preble (DDG-88), USS Mustin (DDG-89), USS Germantown (LSD-42), USS Tortuga (LSD-46), USS Harpers Ferry (LSD-49), USS Essex (LHD-2), USS Blue Ridge (LCC-19), USNS Safeguard (T-ARS-50).

==== Radiologic incidents ====
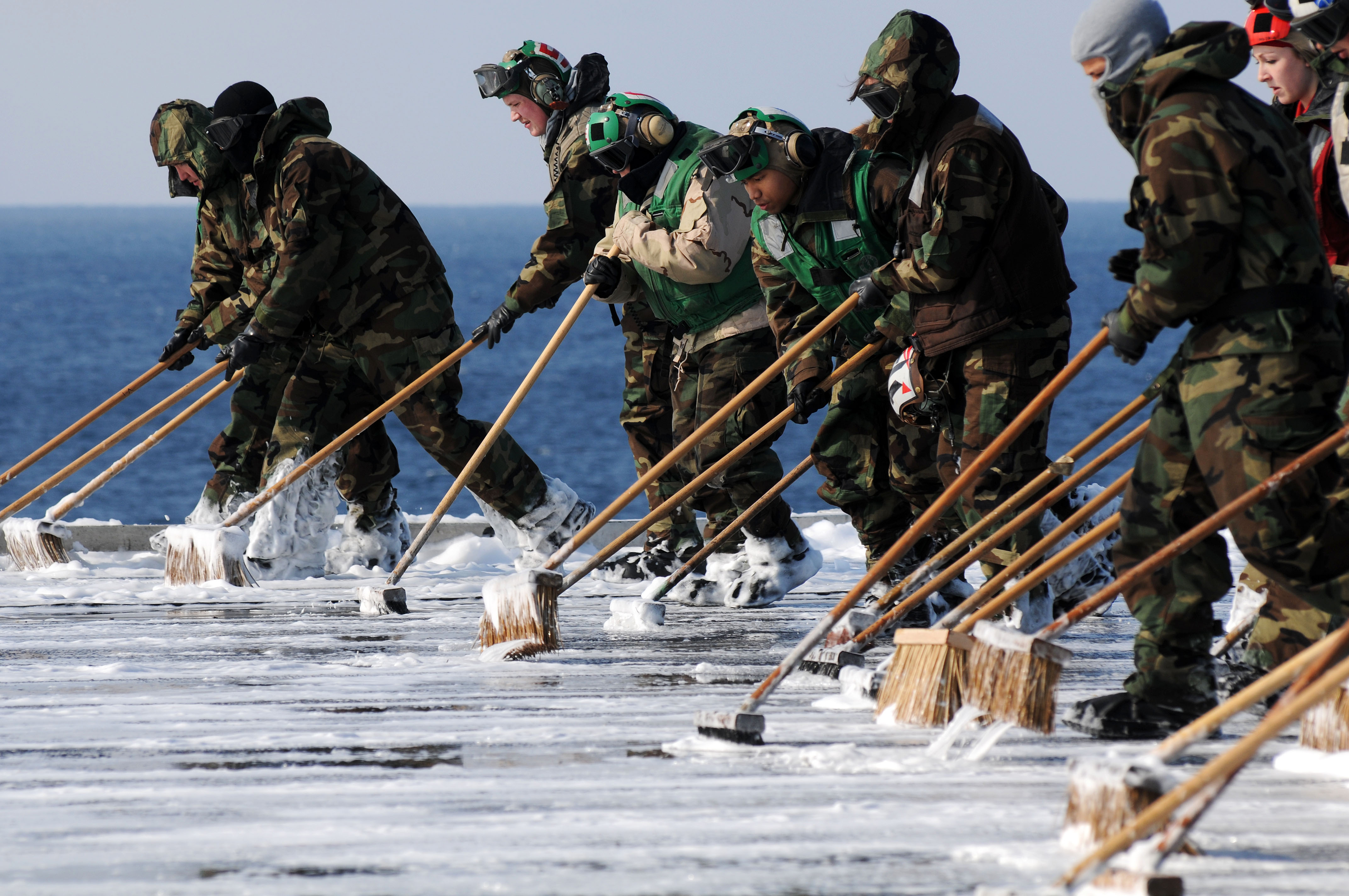
Sailors scrub the flight deck of USS Ronald Reagan. (See further Images of radiation decontamination of the USS Ronald Reagan)

The US Navy dispatched aircraft carrier USS Ronald Reagan and other vessels which flew a series of helicopter operations. A spokesman for U.S. 7th Fleet naval personnel stated that monitoring equipment indicated that the warship had been exposed to radiation. Separate hand-held equipment also picked up the contamination on 17 crew members, who had participated in rescue operations. Commander Jeff Davis said that the exposure was low enough that after the crew washed with soap and water, follow-up tests were negative. Davis characterized the exposure as comparable to routine civilian activities and reiterated the US Navy's commitment to the relief operation. As a precaution, the aircraft carrier was repositioned farther offshore, away from the downwind direction of the plant and decontaminated. Several helicopters were decontaminated after returning from flights. One helicopter made a landing at Fukushima Airport after experiencing rotor icing and exposed some Australian and New Zealand search and rescue team members to low levels of radiation.

Radiation precautions were taken at U.S. bases, including USS George Washington leaving port at Yokosuka after very low levels of radiation were detected there. Part of its air complement moved to Misawa Air Base to support relief operations. External scientists not participating in the Operation have concluded these precautions failed to protect not only American military members, but also the millions of citizens in Japan operating under the auspice that radiation wasn't a concern. The effects of the radiation have not been analyzed in detail to conclude one way or the other. Further, it is alleged that there were pressures by the countries of Japan and the United States, in order to not disturb their international relationship, to pressure media sources to not accurately report on the severity of the radiation exposure.

Three years after the accident, servicemen who were part of the operation have reported radiation-related disorders, including cancers, thyroid disease, uterine bleeding and other ailments. 51 crew members have filed a lawsuit against the Tokyo Electric Power Company, which owns the Fukushima Daiichi power plant. (Under US law, military personnel are not permitted to sue the armed forces for damages.)

=== Marine Corps ===
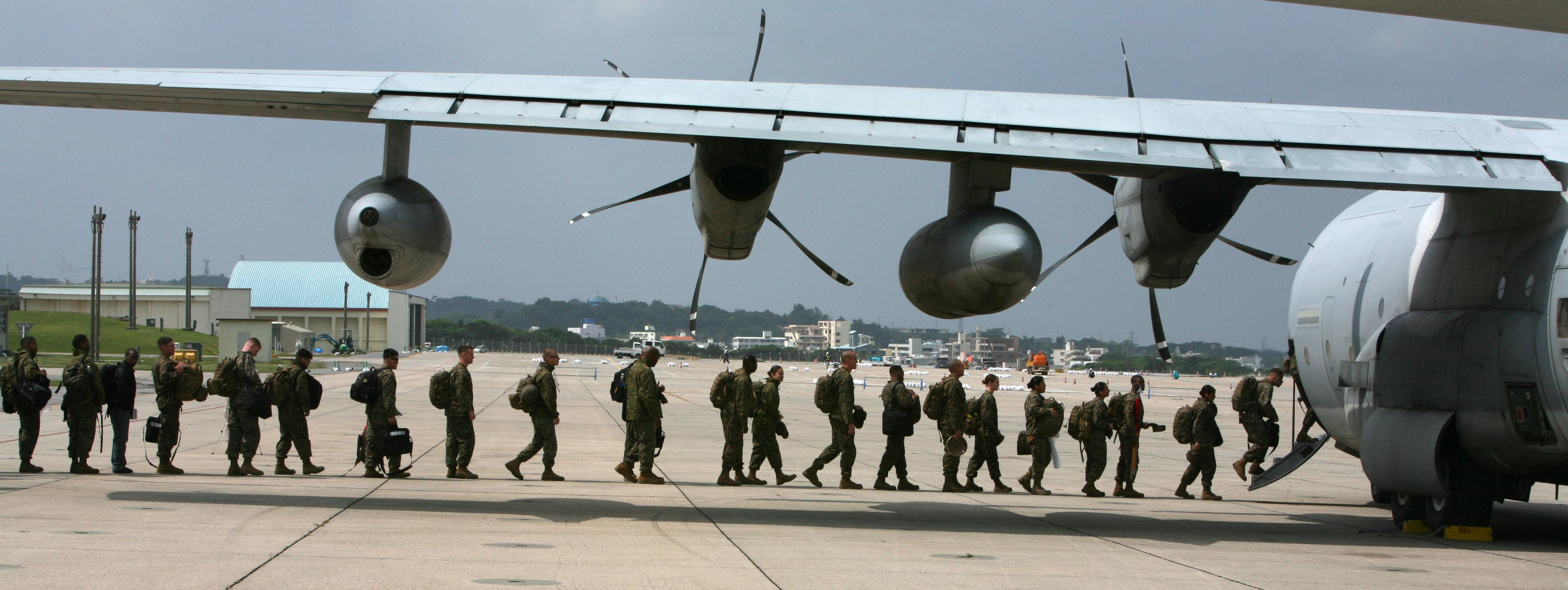
Marines move from Okinawa aboard a KC-130

United States Marine Corps facilities in Japan escaped major damage, with no reported casualties. This intact infrastructure allowed Marines from III Marine Expeditionary Force and Marine Corps Base Camp Smedley D. Butler to mobilize aid quickly.

Marines based at Marine Corps Air Station Futenma moved command and control teams and systems to NAF Atsugi. Eight KC-130Js from VMGR-152 and eight CH-46E and four CH-53 Super Stallions transport helicopters from HMM-265, all from MCAS Futenma, were made available to transport rescue teams and equipment, as well as provide search and rescue.

The 31st Marine Expeditionary Unit responded to Northern Japan from Malaysia and Indonesia, where the unit was conducting Theater Security Cooperation exercises. The 31st MEU delivered relief supplies to five cities, one island and one Japanese ship. More than 164,000 pounds of food and relief supplies were delivered, along with thousands of gallons of water. Elements of the 31st MEU, including Combat Logistics Battalion 31, 2nd Battalion 5th Marines went ashore on Oshima Island to deliver critical supplies and assist in debris removal.

MV Westpac Express, a civil-registered fast ferry chartered by the Marine Corps, was made available to transport equipment from Okinawa to Honshu. Westpac Express made two sorties in support of Operation Tomodachi. The ship moved 450 tons of cargo, including 7-ton trucks, fuel tankers, generators and water tanks from Okinawa to Iwakuni, Japan, arriving 15 March. On 20 March, Westpac Express loaded 226 pallets of bottled water at Pohang, ROK, off-loading at Iwakuni the next day.

=== Air Force ===
A United States Air Force KC-135 Stratotanker arrived at Misawa Air Base on 14 March with the first batch of relief workers and 50 civil engineers from Kadena Air Base.

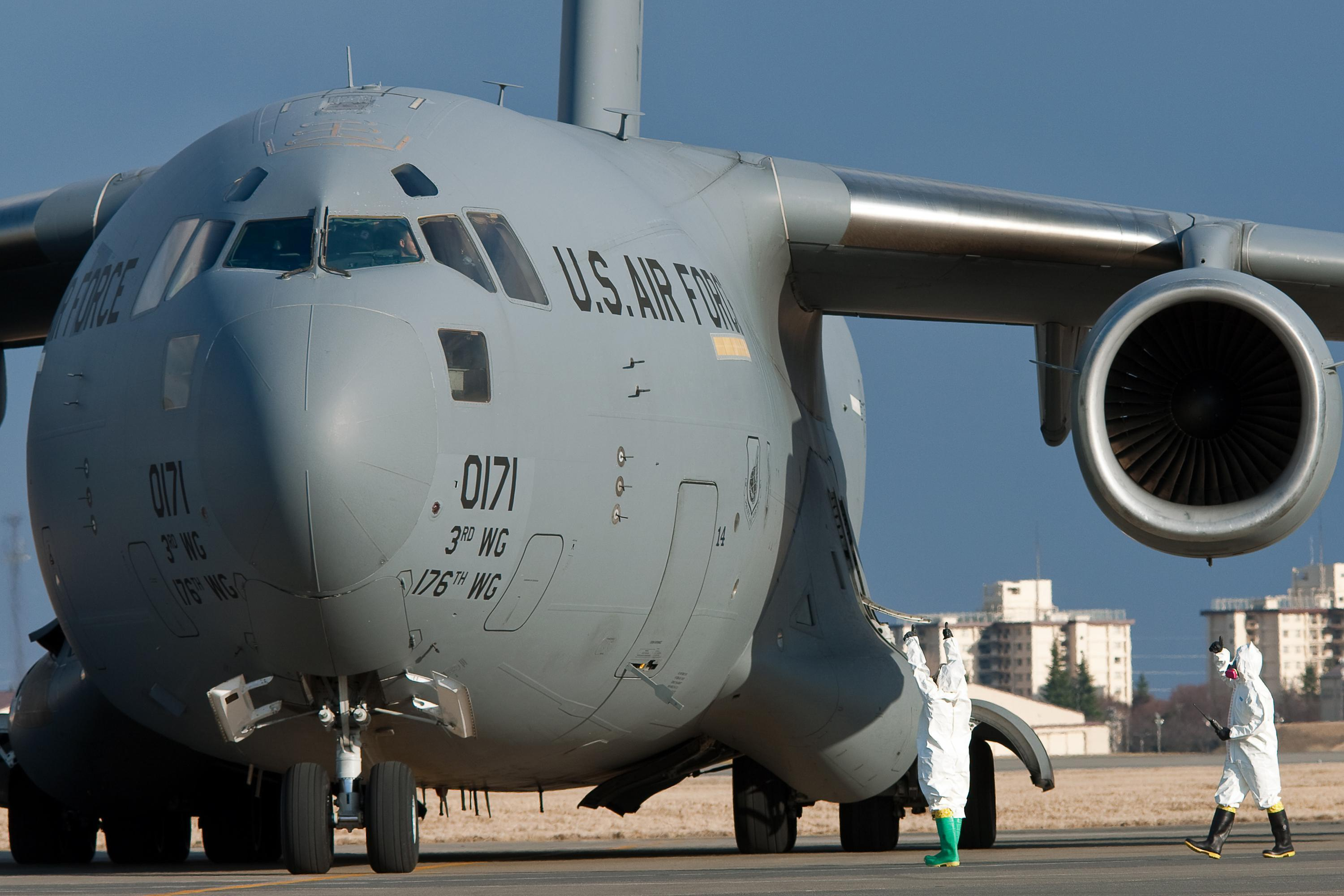
A USAF C-17 is checked for radiation at Yokota after a relief flight.

Two C-17A Globemaster cargo aircraft from Joint Base Lewis-McChord were made available to transport rescue teams and equipment. A Global Hawk unmanned aerial vehicle was deployed from Guam for damage assessments.

==== Air base ====
Yokota Air Base is the hub for air operations from which cleanup crews were dispatched to clean up Sendai airport. At a Town Hall meeting, Colonel "Otto" Feather, the Commander of the 374th Air Wing USAF, presented an overview of joint forces operations in support of the Japanese and emphasized teamwork between various players. He stated that "we are very blessed" to be in Japan because it had a highly sophisticated set of technologies to minimize the damage but that the personnel, logistic and financing problems were formidable.

He repeatedly asserted that the situation is "eminently controllable" in part due to highly experienced personnel available for various contingencies. US military personnel stationed at the Air Base expressed interest in making cash donations – in dollars or yen – to the American Red Cross and other organizations working in the Japanese relief effort.

=== Army ===
Several Sikorsky UH-60 Black Hawk helicopters from the U.S. Army Japan Aviation Detachment have been made available for relief efforts. A disaster assessment team from Camp Zama was deployed to the Sendai area to join the forward command post. A 59-member logistics team from Sagamihara General Depot helped reopen Sendai Airport.

== Operation Pacific Passage ==
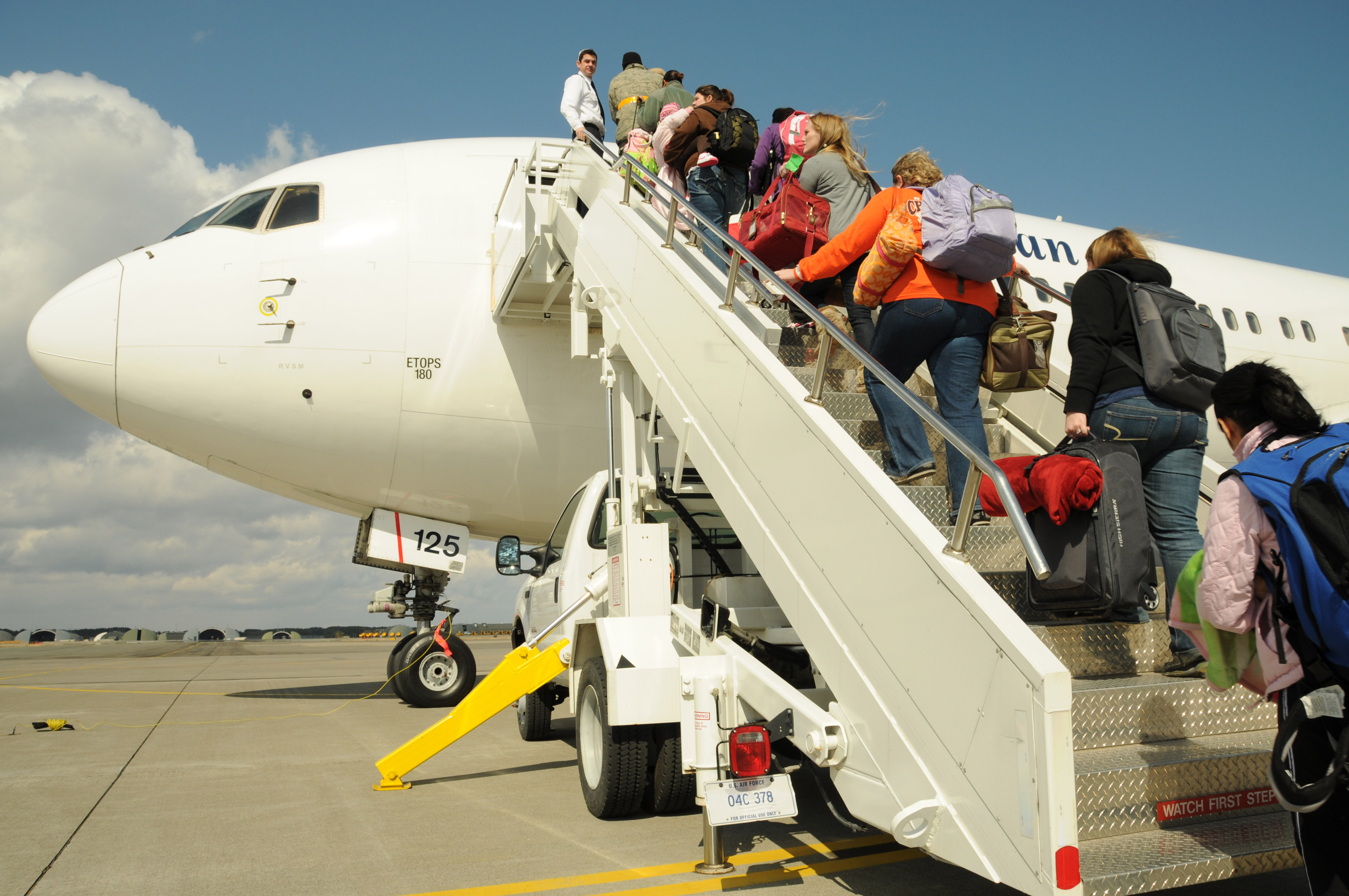
Charter flights carried family of U.S. service members in Japan to the U.S. West Coast. (See further Category:Operation Pacific Passage)

Over 7,000 family members of U.S. service members in Japan were voluntarily evacuated in March to Seattle–Tacoma International Airport and Travis Air Force Base in the U.S. during Operation Pacific Passage. Concerns over the uncertainty of the radiation situation and reducing the burden of supporting families while conducting relief operations and the related troop movements led to the relocation program.

== Interagency collaboration ==
With Yokota Air Base available, US Office of Foreign Disaster Assistance sent Urban Search and Rescue California Task Force 2 and Virginia Task Force 1. Two urban search and rescue teams arrived at the pending merger with a 60 member/two-dog team from the UK. On 3/16, a RAAF C-17 Globemaster III landed on Kadena's flight line. USAF personnel assisted Royal Australian Air Force and Japan Ground Self Defense Force to load supplies and fly to mainland Japan.

== Timeline ==
=== 11 March 2011 ===
USS Tortuga conducts an emergency recall of all personnel onboard and is underway at 19:00 en route Pohang, South Korea to on load MH-53E helicopters from HM-14 Detachment 1.

=== 12 March 2011 ===
Four Marine KC-130J Aircraft from VMGR-152 deployed from MCAS Futenma to the Japanese Mainland to support relief operations. About a hundred airmen and three MC-130P Combat Shadows, with 19 maintenance personnel, from the 353rd Special Operations Group deployed on 12 March, one day after the earthquake. Col. Stephen Bissonnette, deputy commander of the 353rd SOG stated that "[T]he devastation caused by the earthquake is truly heartbreaking...As part of coordinated relief efforts, the group will work tirelessly with our Japanese counterparts and other relief organizations to help the people affected by the earthquake recover..."

=== 13 March 2011 ===
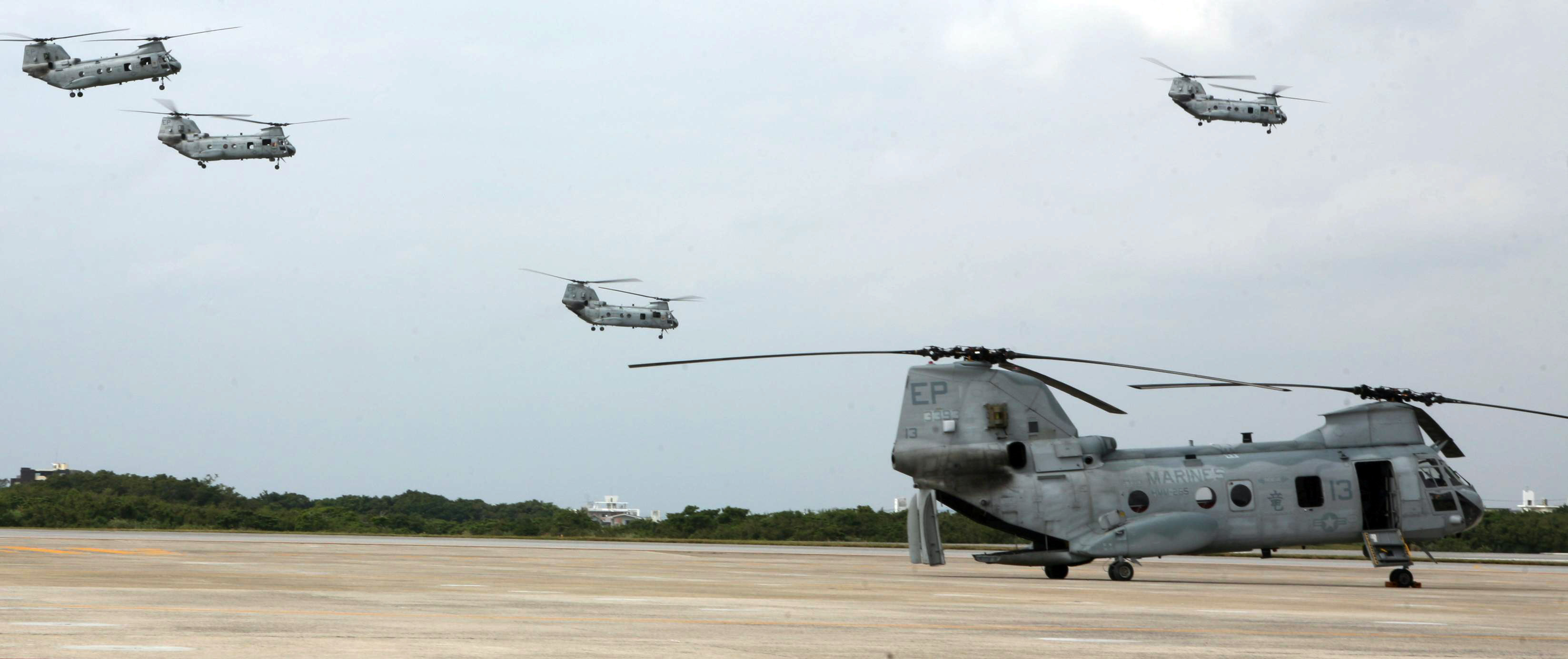
Marine helicopters depart Okinawa for Atsugi

Four additional Marine KC-130J aircraft from VMGR-152 deployed from MCAS Futenma along with nearly 80 maintainers, effectively relocating the squadron to the Japanese Mainland. Eight Marine CH-46E helicopters from HMM-265 deployed to NAS Atsugi to begin relief operations. A USAF KC-135 Stratotanker arrived at Misawa Air Base on Sunday with the first batch of relief workers and 50 civil engineers from Kadena Air Base.

USNS BRIDGE (T-AOE 10) arrives on scene with 2 embarked SH-60S from HSC-23.

Two US urban search and rescue teams arrived from Fairfax County, Virginia and Los Angeles County, California with a total of 140 rescuers and 14 rescue dogs. The teams merged with a 63-member search and rescue team from the UK. The combined US-UK operation deployed to the town of Sumita, Iwate to set up a base of operations. The teams performed daily search and rescue missions in the cities of Ofunato and Kamaishi for five days until departing for home.

Members of the U.S. Navy Reserve Detachment 105 were joined by six members of the Defense Threat Reduction Agency (DTRA) Liaison (LNO) and Consequence Management Advisory Team (CMAT). These two elements formed the initial core of the United States Forces Japan (USFJ) Radiological Consequence Management Team (RCMT) whose mission was to advise Lieutenant General Burton Field Commander USFJ on matters related to the nuclear fuel cycle, potential hazards, and potential mitigation of a radiological incident. DTRA Liaison and CMAT personnel were among the first U.S. personnel to visit the TEPCO response site (J-Village) located a few kilometers from the Fukushima Daiichi reactor. DTRA personnel also established relationships with TEPCO engineering and management deconflicting information for the U.S. Ambassador and United States Forces Japan Commander.

HM-14 DET 1 rapidly deploys to assist in relief efforts on board USS Tortuga. The 18th Civil Engineer Squadron also arrived at Misawa Air Base for Operation Tomodachi.

=== 14 March 2011 ===
The Yokota Town Hall Meeting was conducted in which personnel and their families were reassured that the problems, though formidable, were manageable given the highly qualified Japanese, US, and international personnel on the scene. There was an assurance that there would be daily monitoring of radiation levels. Many of the service men and women expressed interest in making financial contributions through the Red Cross.

Members of 623d Air Control Flight, Kadena AB, Japan, callsign "Lightsword" deployed to Honshu, Japan. The Lightsword team deployed to a JASDF radar facility, to assist in the command and control of relief efforts for the airlift effort following the 2011 Tōhoku earthquake and tsunami.

=== 15 March 2011 ===
Work continued to re-establish a workable landing strip at Sendai Airport. Kadena AFB personnel restored minimal power at Misawa to Air Force personnel, still pending Navy power restoration. The USS George Washington was docked for maintenance in Yokosuka, about 175 miles (280 kilometers) from the plant, when instruments detected the radiation at 7 am Tuesday (6 p.m. ET Monday).

=== 16 March 2011 ===
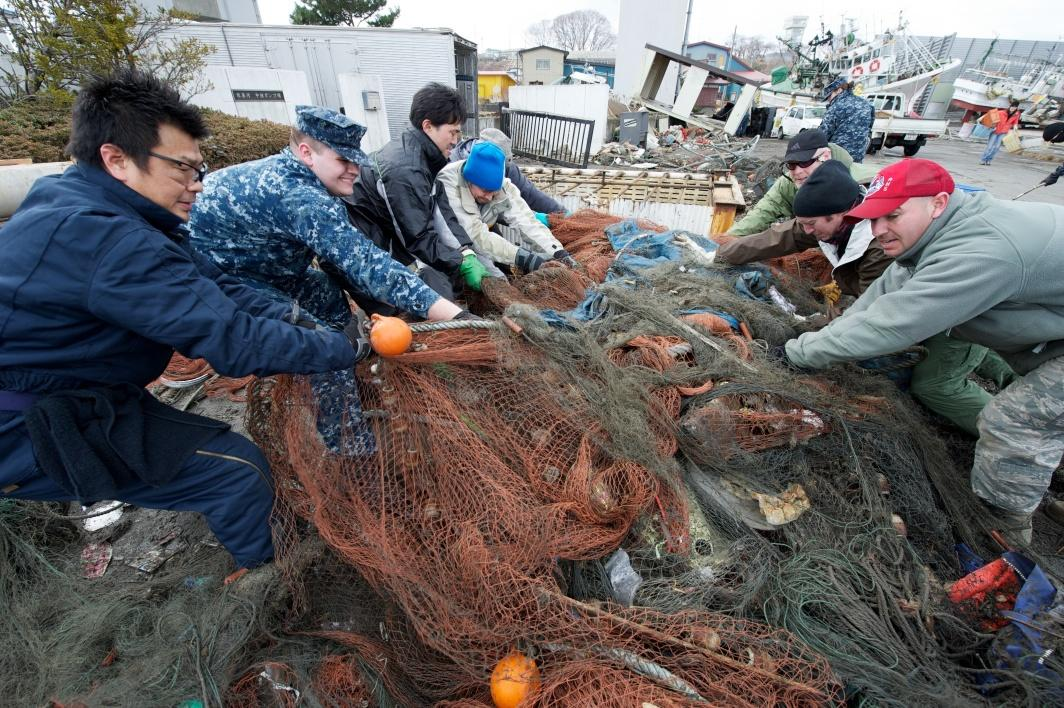
U.S. sailors assist locals and French volunteers to clear the harbor in Hachinohe

Rear Admiral Wren, the Commander, US Naval Forces Japan, sent out a letter advising personnel to limit outdoor activity at Fleet Activities Yokosuka and Naval Air Facility Atsugi due to newly developing, low level radiation.

=== 17 March 2011 ===
The Pentagon said Thursday that it was sending more specialized aircraft to evaluate nuclear contamination at and around the Fukushima site, including a WC-135 Constant Phoenix from Offutt Air Force Base to take air samples, which aircraft had formerly been used as a sniffer with regard to North Korean nuclear weapons testing.

Carrier Air Wing-5 was relocated from NAF Atsugi to Andersen Air Force Base in Guam temporarily, what the Navy calls a "force posture adjustment" for Operation Tomodachi. The air wing's SH-60 helicopters from HS-14 and HSL-51 and C-2 Greyhound from Fleet Logistics Support Squadron 30 Det. 5 remained behind in support of the operation. As a precaution, the navy has also stopped moving its personnel to Japan as well.

According to NPR, unmanned Global Hawk drones and a U-2 were also deployed, along with a planning team from the U.S. Northern Command in Colorado.

=== 23 March 2011 ===
Navy officials halted air operations from USS Ronald Reagan temporarily on Wednesday so they could decontaminate the ship from the radiation the ship received. While the radiation did not pose any significant health risk, "it needed to go away," Cmdr. Ron Rutan, chief engineer for the Reagan.

=== 25 March 2011 ===
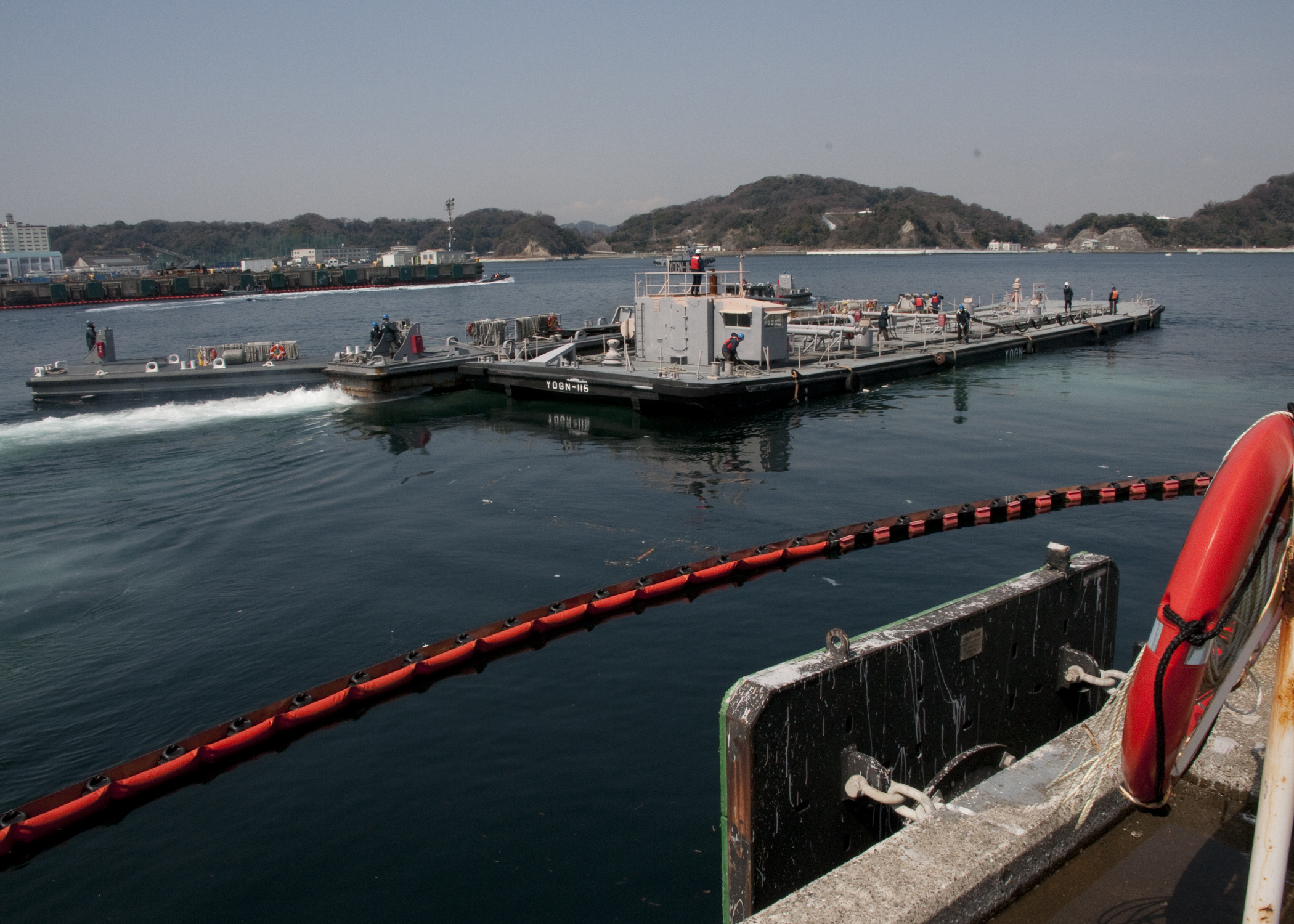
U.S. barge loaded with fresh water for Fukushima Power Plant

Mississippi and Alabama National Guard forces joined those from Kentucky and Guam to assist with Operation Tomodachi.

500,000 gallons of fresh water has been provided from the US Navy to support cooling efforts at the Fukushima Daiichi nuclear power plant.

=== 1 May 2011 ===
US troops will begin to withdraw from the Tohoku coastline and return to their bases, and the US-Japan Joint Cooperation Center in Sendai has closed down. While it will continue to airlift personnel and supplies as needed, the work on the ground will be handed over to the Japanese Self-Defence Forces.

=== 4 May 2011 ===
Marines from the Consequence Management Support Force return to Okinawa from mainland Japan 4 May, representing the departure of the last major element of the III Marine Expeditionary Force deployed to mainland in support of Operation Tomodachi.

=== 4 September 2012 ===
United States Department of Defense releases location-based radiation dose estimates for U.S. personnel involved in Operation Tomodachi on the Environmental Health Surveillance Registries website.

=== Clean-up efforts ===
US troops assisted Japanese government workers in cleaning up debris and rubble left by the tsunami.

== Effect on Japan–US relations ==
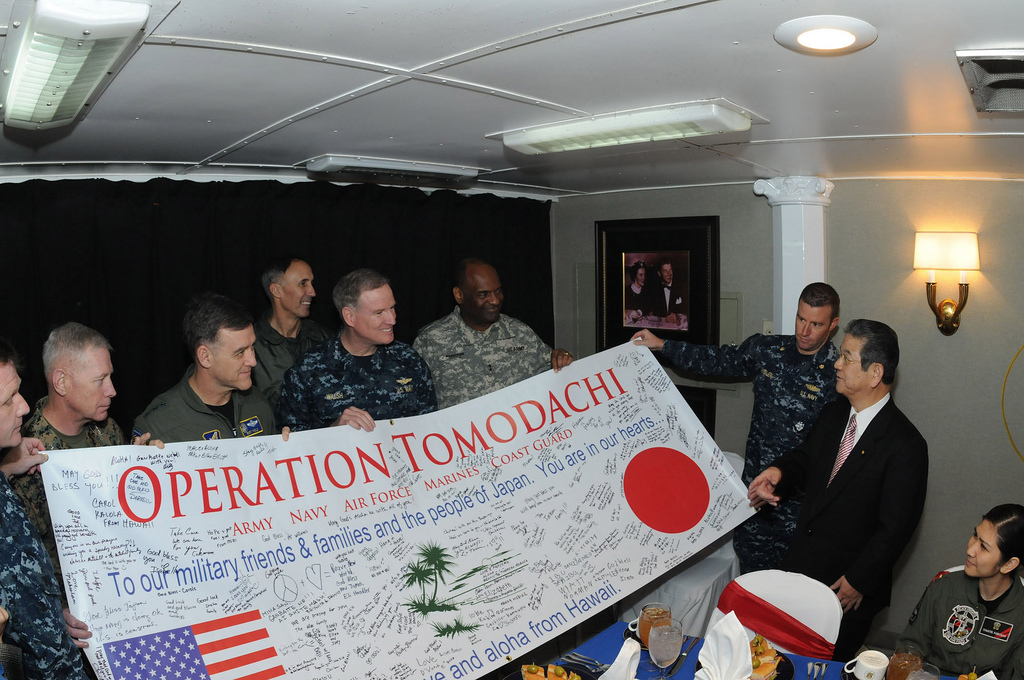
Toshimi Kitazawa is given an Operation Tomodachi banner on 4 April 2011

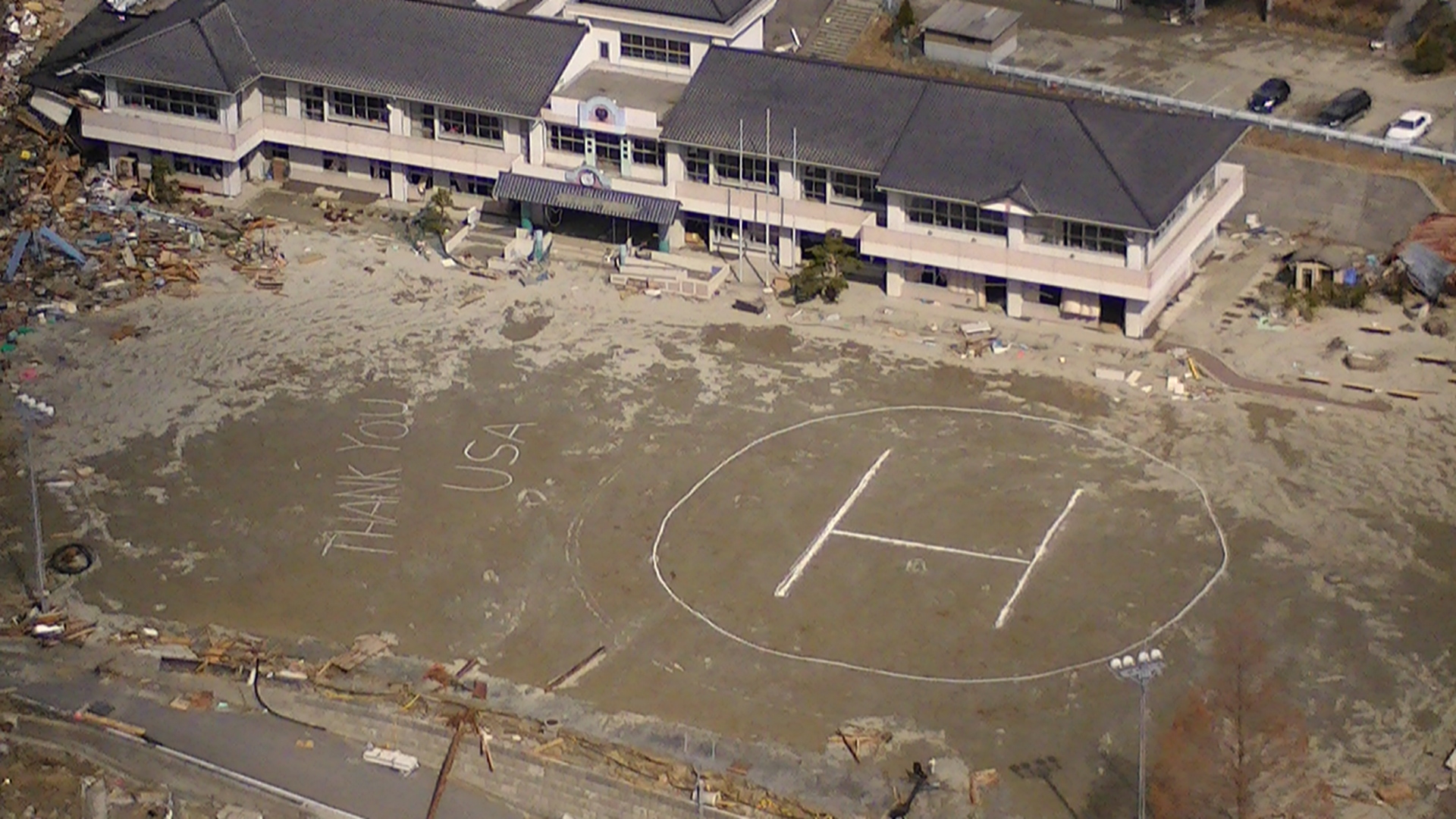
An aerial view of a helicopter landing zone near an evacuee center shows a "THANK YOU USA" message in the mud.

The disaster may have brought a diplomatic opening to Japan. The support provided by the US illustrated the value of the relationship between the countries. It was commented that the level of support provided by the US will probably assuage tension over base relocation disputes between the two governments. The Yomiuri Shimbun reported that the "coordinated relief activities at the disaster sites are expected to deepen the Japan-U.S. alliance."

On 4 April 2011, Japan's minister of defense, Toshimi Kitazawa, accompanied by US ambassador to Japan John Roos, visited the Ronald Reagan to thank its crew for its assistance as part of Operation Tomodachi. Said Kitazawa, "I have never been more encouraged by and proud of the fact that the United States is our ally."

On 10 April 2011, Japan's Prime Minister, Naoto Kan, visited Camp Sendai to talk to U.S. service members. The prime minister spoke of the immediate response of the U.S. military and expressed his belief that the joint efforts between the U.S. military and the JGSDF will strengthen the bonds between the Japanese people and the United States.

A nationwide survey conducted in Japan from September to October 2011 found that an all-time high of 82 percent had friendly feelings toward the US. Japan's Foreign Ministry attributed the number to the effects of Operation Tomodachi. Similarly, the Pew Research Center showed that 85% of Japanese people had a favorable opinion of the U.S. in 2011, the highest in a decade.

== See also ==
- Operation Pacific Assist
- Humanitarian response to the 2011 Tōhoku earthquake and tsunami
- Fukushima I nuclear accidents
- International reaction to Fukushima I nuclear accidents
- U.S.-Japan Council
