= Pecos Bill (disambiguation) =

Pecos Bill is a mythical American cowboy.

Pecos Bill may also refer to:

- Pecos Bill Tall Tale Inn and Cafe, a restaurant in Walt Disney World and Tokyo Disneyland
- Pecos Bill (comics), an Italian comic series
- Pecos Bill (album), a 1988 album by Robin Williams
- Pecos Bill: The Greatest Cowboy of All Time, a 1937 novel by James Cloyd Bowman
- Pecos Bill, a segment of the 1948 animated feature Melody Time
- William Rufus Shafter (known by his nickname as "Pecos Bill"), a U.S. Army general
