= List of cities and towns severely damaged by the 2011 Tōhoku earthquake and tsunami =

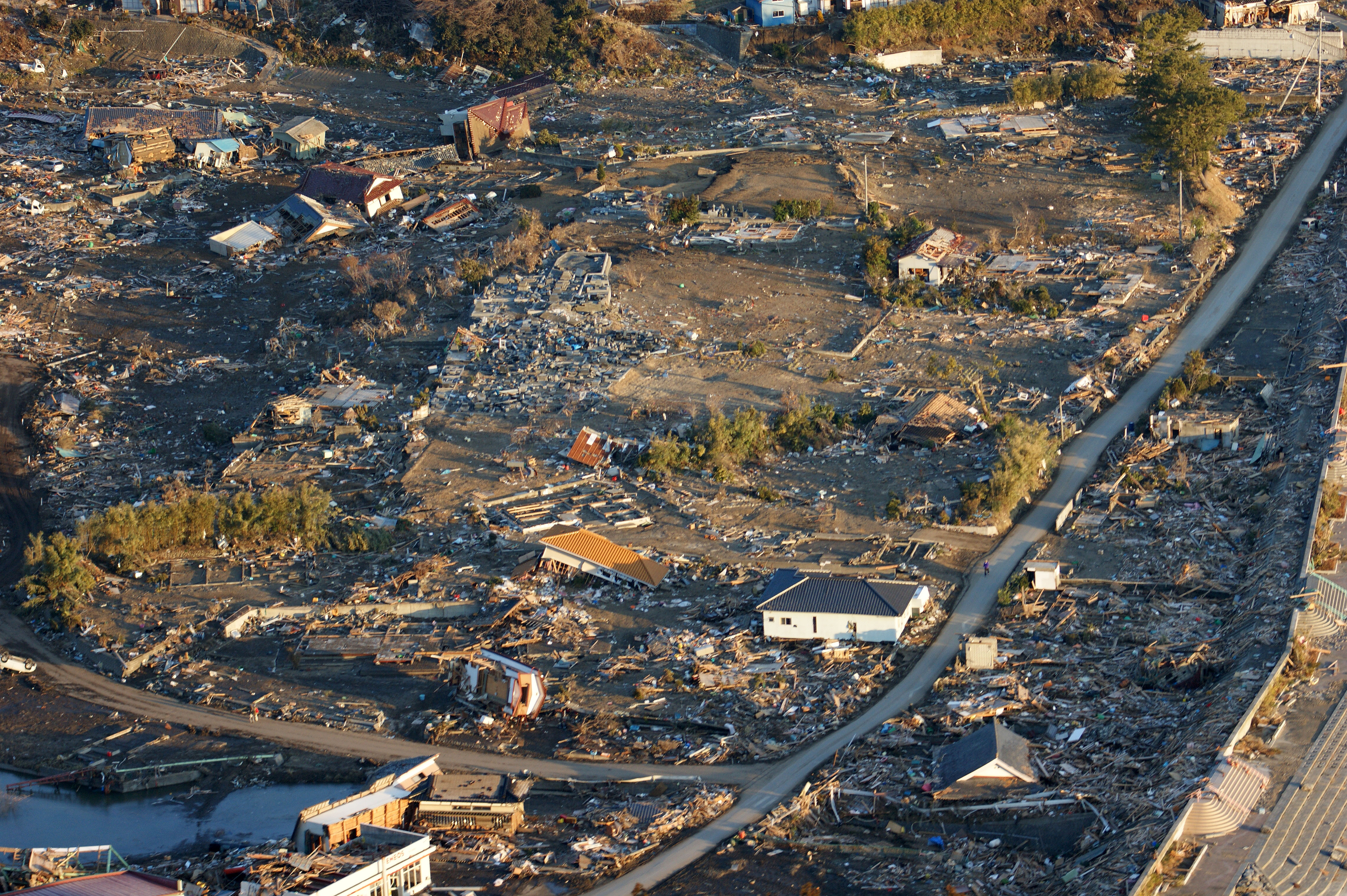

This is an alphabetically sorted list of cities and towns severely damaged by the 2011 Tōhoku earthquake and tsunami. Cities and towns listed here reported at least US$100,000 in damage or at least one death.

City	Region	Country	Deaths	Missing	Injured	Damage costs	References
Aizuwakamatsu	Fukushima Prefecture	Japan	1		6		
Akkeshi	Hokkaido Prefecture	Japan				¥2.87 billion (US$26.15 million)	
Aomori	Aomori Prefecture	Japan			1	¥90.92 million (US$828,437.36)	
Asahi	Chiba Prefecture	Japan	20	2	272		
Chiyoda	Tokyo Metropolis	Japan	2		28		
Crescent City	California	United States	1				
Erimo	Hokkaido Prefecture	Japan				¥791 million (US$7.21 million)	
Fudai	Iwate Prefecture	Japan		1	4		
Fujisawa	Kanagawa Prefecture	Japan	1		8		
Fukaura	Aomori Prefecture	Japan				¥150 million (US$1.37 million)	
Fukushima	Fukushima Prefecture	Japan	3		19		
Futaba	Fukushima Prefecture	Japan	30	5			
Gonohe	Aomori Prefecture	Japan			5	¥139.6 million (US$1.27 million)	
Hachinohe	Aomori Prefecture	Japan	1	1	71	¥120.28 billion (US$1.1 billion)	
Haga	Tochigi Prefecture	Japan	1		28		
Hakodate	Hokkaido Prefecture	Japan	1		1		
Hanamaki	Iwate Prefecture	Japan	1		20		
Hashikami	Aomori Prefecture	Japan				¥1.34 billion (US$12.17 million)	
Higashidōri	Aomori Prefecture	Japan				¥280.27 million (US$2.55 million)	
Higashimatsushima	Miyagi Prefecture	Japan	1044	94			
Hirakawa	Aomori Prefecture	Japan				¥130.34 million (US$1.19 million)	
Hiranai	Aomori Prefecture	Japan				¥21.5 million (US$195,854.21)	
Hirono	Fukushima Prefecture	Japan	2	1			
Hiroo	Fukushima Prefecture	Japan				¥1.05 billion (US$9.57 million)	
Hitachinaka	Ibaraki Prefecture	Japan	2		28		
Hitachiōta	Ibaraki Prefecture	Japan	1		2		
Iitate	Fukushima Prefecture	Japan	1		1		
Ichinohe	Iwate Prefecture	Japan	1				
Ichinoseki	Iwate Prefecture	Japan	15	2	35		
Ishikawa	Fukushima Prefecture	Japan	1		4		
Ishinomaki	Miyagi Prefecture	Japan	3278	688	Unknown		
Iwaizumi	Iwate Prefecture	Japan	10				
Iwaki	Fukushima Prefecture	Japan	310	38			
Iwanuma	Miyagi Prefecture	Japan	182	1			
Jayapura	Papua	Indonesia	1				
Jōsō	Ibaraki Prefecture	Japan	1		4		
Kamaishi	Iwate Prefecture	Japan	994	152	Unknown		
Kanagawa	Kanagawa Prefecture	Japan	4		131		
Kashima	Ibaraki Prefecture	Japan	1				
Kashiwa	Chiba Prefecture	Japan	1		22		
Katsurao	Fukushima Prefecture	Japan	7				
Kawasaki	Kanagawa Prefecture	Japan	1		17		
Kesennuma	Miyagi Prefecture	Japan	1023	383	Unknown		
Kitaibaraki	Ibaraki Prefecture	Japan					
Kitakami	Iwate Prefecture	Japan	1	1	34		
Kōriyama	Fukushima Prefecture	Japan	1		4		
Kōtō	Tokyo Metropolis	Japan	2				
Kuji	Iwate Prefecture	Japan	4	2	10		
Kuroishi	Aomori Prefecture	Japan				¥14.9 million (US$135,753.99)	
Kushiro	Hokkaido Prefecture	Japan				¥3.22 billion (US$29.34 million)	
Kushiro	Hokkaido Prefecture	Japan				¥325.1 million (US$2.96 million)	
Machida	Tokyo Metropolis	Japan	2		15		
Matsushima	Miyagi Prefecture	Japan	2				
Miharu	Fukushima Prefecture	Japan	1		2		
Minamisanriku	Miyagi Prefecture	Japan	558	343	Unknown		
Minamisōma	Fukushima Prefecture	Japan	640	23			
Misawa	Aomori Prefecture	Japan	2		1	¥7.84 billion (US$71.39 million)	
Mito	Ibaraki Prefecture	Japan	2		83		
Miyako	Iwate Prefecture	Japan	476	94	33		
Morioka	Iwate Prefecture	Japan	6		10		
Mutsu	Aomori Prefecture	Japan			1	¥311.27 million (US$2.84 million)	
Nakadomari	Aomori Prefecture	Japan				¥29.11 million (US$265,230.07)	
Namegata	Ibaraki Prefecture	Japan	2		5		
Namie	Fukushima Prefecture	Japan	146	38			
Nanbu	Aomori Prefecture	Japan			1	¥102.72 million (US$935,908.88)	
Naraha	Fukushima Prefecture	Japan	11	2			
Narashino	Chiba Prefecture	Japan	1		6		
Nasukarasuyama	Tochigi Prefecture	Japan	2		7		
Natori	Miyagi Prefecture	Japan	911	71			
Nemuro	Hokkaido Prefecture	Japan				¥4.73 billion (US$43.05 million)	
Nikkō	Tochigi Prefecture	Japan	1		4		
Nishigō	Fukushima Prefecture	Japan	3		4		
Noda	Chiba Prefecture	Japan	1		5		
Noda	Iwate Prefecture	Japan	39		19		
Ōarai	Ibaraki Prefecture	Japan	24	1	706		
Obanazawa	Yamagata Prefecture	Japan	1		4		
Ōfunato	Iwate Prefecture	Japan	423	79	2		
Oirase	Aomori Prefecture	Japan			3	¥2.59 billion (US$23.64 million)	
Ōkuma	Fukushima Prefecture	Japan	84	1	Unknown		
Onagawa	Miyagi Prefecture	Japan	571	343	Unknown		
Ōsaki	Miyagi Prefecture	Japan	5		222		
Ōsato	Miyagi Prefecture	Japan	1		6		
Ōshū	Iwate Prefecture	Japan	3	1	21		
Ōtsuchi	Iwate Prefecture	Japan	856	415	Unknown		
Rifu	Miyagi Prefecture	Japan	46				
Rikuzentakata	Iwate Prefecture	Japan	1606	201	Unknown		
Rokkasho	Aomori Prefecture	Japan			1	¥84.21 million (US$767,325.74)	
Ryūgasaki	Ibaraki Prefecture	Japan	1		5		
Sanmu	Chiba Prefecture	Japan	1		2		
Sannohe	Aomori Prefecture	Japan			1	¥40.72 million (US$370,979.5)	
Sendai	Miyagi Prefecture	Japan	704	26	Unknown		
Shibata	Miyagi Prefecture	Japan	2		4		
Shichigahama	Miyagi Prefecture	Japan	70	5	Unknown		
Shichinohe	Aomori Prefecture	Japan				¥78 million (US$710,706.15)	
Shimotsuma	Ibaraki Prefecture	Japan	1				
Shinchi	Fukushima Prefecture	Japan	109	1			
Shiogama	Miyagi Prefecture	Japan	20	1			
Shirakawa	Fukushima Prefecture	Japan	12		3		
Shirako	Chiba Prefecture	Japan	1				
Shiroishi	Miyagi Prefecture	Japan	1		18		
Shizukuishi	Iwate Prefecture	Japan	1				
Sōma	Fukushima Prefecture	Japan	456	3			
Sukagawa	Fukushima Prefecture	Japan	10	1	1		
Tagajō	Miyagi Prefecture	Japan	188	1	Unknown		
Takko	Aomori Prefecture	Japan				¥284.12 million (US$2.59 million)	
Tama	Tokyo Metropolis	Japan	1				
Tamura	Fukushima Prefecture	Japan	1		5		
Tanohata	Iwate Prefecture	Japan	17	15	8		
Takahagi	Ibaraki Prefecture	Japan	1		19		
Takizawa	Iwate Prefecture	Japan	1				
Tatebayashi	Gunma Prefecture	Japan	1		1		
Tōhoku	Aomori Prefecture	Japan			1	¥27.94 million (US$254,533.03)	
Tōkai	Ibaraki Prefecture	Japan	4		5		
Tokyo	Tokyo Metropolis	Japan	7		90		
Tomioka	Fukushima Prefecture	Japan	19	6			
Tōno	Iwate Prefecture	Japan	4	1	4		
Tōnoshō	Chiba Prefecture	Japan	1		4		
Towada	Aomori Prefecture	Japan			1	¥34.41 million (US$313,494.31)	
Toyokoro	Hokkaido Prefecture	Japan				¥120 million (US$1.09 million)	
Toyoura	Hokkaido Prefecture	Japan				¥3.24 billion (US$29.52 million)	
Tsukuba	Ibaraki Prefecture	Japan	1		13		
Ushiku	Ibaraki Prefecture	Japan	1		6		
Wakuya	Miyagi Prefecture	Japan	1	2	47		
Watari	Miyagi Prefecture	Japan	257	13			
Yachiyo	Chiba Prefecture	Japan	1		3		
Yahaba	Iwate Prefecture	Japan	1				
Yamada	Iwate Prefecture	Japan	687	143	Unknown		
Yamagata	Yamagata Prefecture	Japan	2		9		
Yamamoto	Miyagi Prefecture	Japan	671	19			
Yokohama	Kanagawa Prefecture	Japan	2		76		
