= Renzo Pecco =

Italian surgeon and professor (1900–1975)

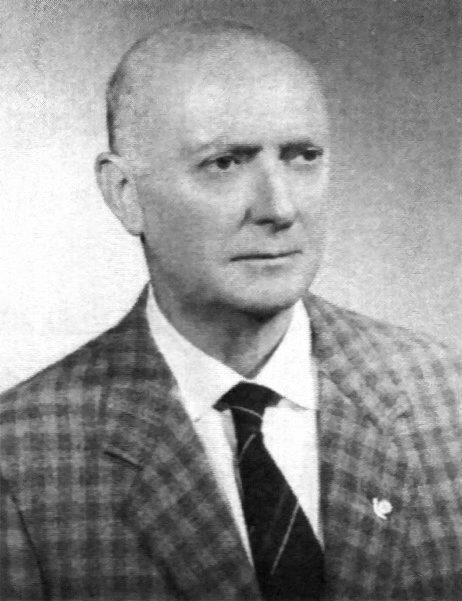
Renzo Pecco

Renzo Pecco ( 17 September 1900 – 11 August 1975) was an Italian surgeon and professor.

He was the head of the surgical ward of Sant'Anna's hospital in Como for three decades. He was also a professor at the University of Turin. Pecco's cholecystectomy, was known at the time for its minimal invasiveness and good outcomes. He was president of Como's Rotary Club from 1950–1951 and 1951–1952.

== Early life ==
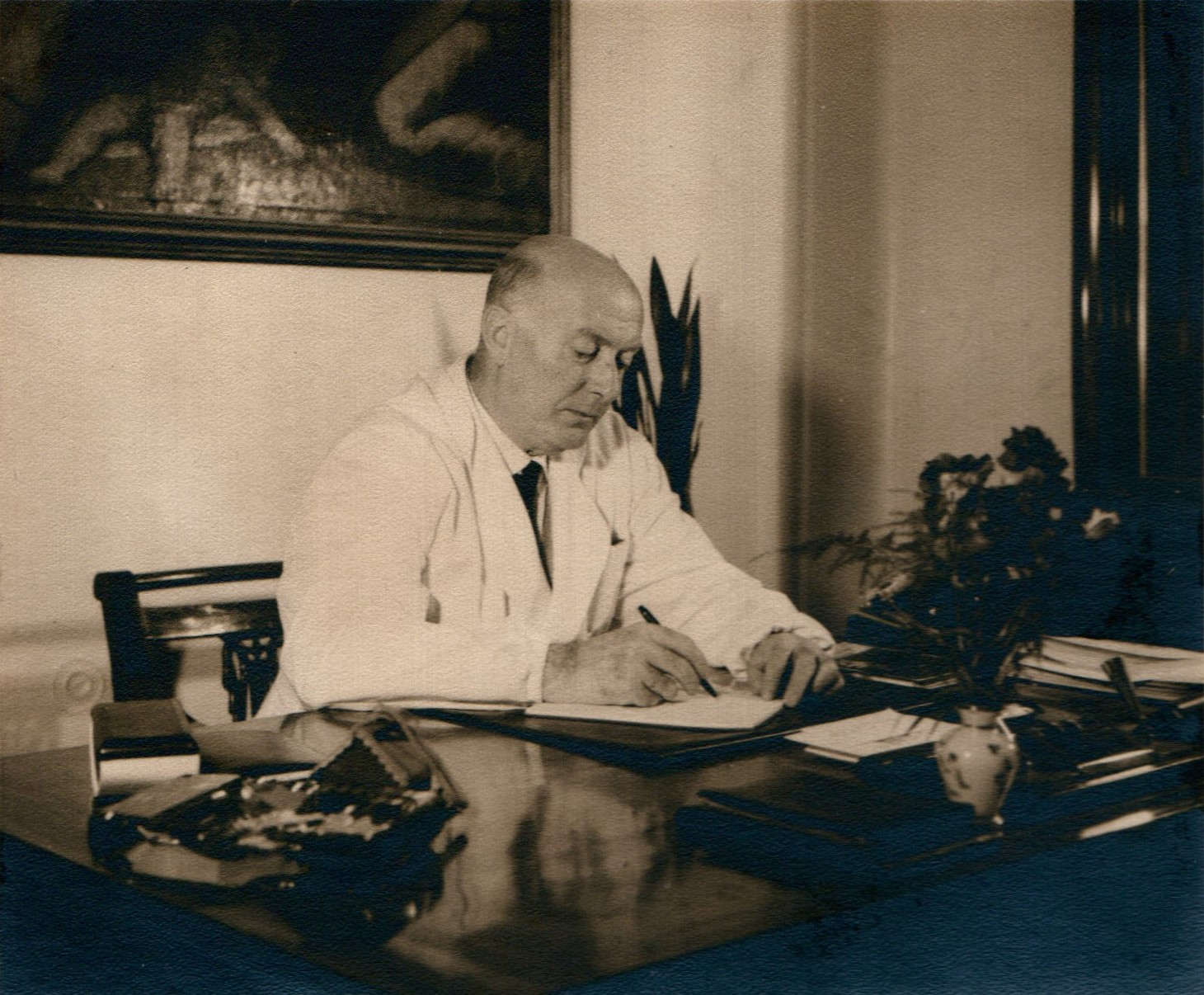
Renzo Pecco at his desk

He was born to Matteo, who was also a surgeon, and Maria Vigna.

He attended liceo classico Alessandro Volta in Como. In 1917, during World War I, he was an aviator and survived after his aircraft was shot down. He received his diploma in classics in 1918.

In 1919, in Lecco, he won the title of Italian Champion in rowing.

In 1924 he graduated with full marks at the Faculty of Medicine of the University of Turin and enrolled in the specialization course of general surgery at the University of Padua

In 1925 he began his medical career under the guidance of the Mario Donati. He became Donati's assistant in 1935. He assumed the role of professor of special pathology at the University of Turin.

In 1930 he married Ida Garrè, nephew of Giovanni Garrè, an entrepreneur who provided the city of Como with its first aqueduct.

In 1938 he became the surgical leader of St. Anna's hospital in Como. He succeeded Attilio Buschi. He introduced sterile surgical masks and gloves as well as informal departments and the establishment of the surgical team approach.

He retired in 1970 and died in 1975 at age 75.

A plaque at the entrance of the surgical ward of St. Anna's reads: "In the surgical division of this hospital has operated for over 30 years Prof. Renzo Pecco, a distinguished surgeon in Como, dispensing humanity and health to all his patients, master of science and life for all his students that conserve living memory."

== Publications ==
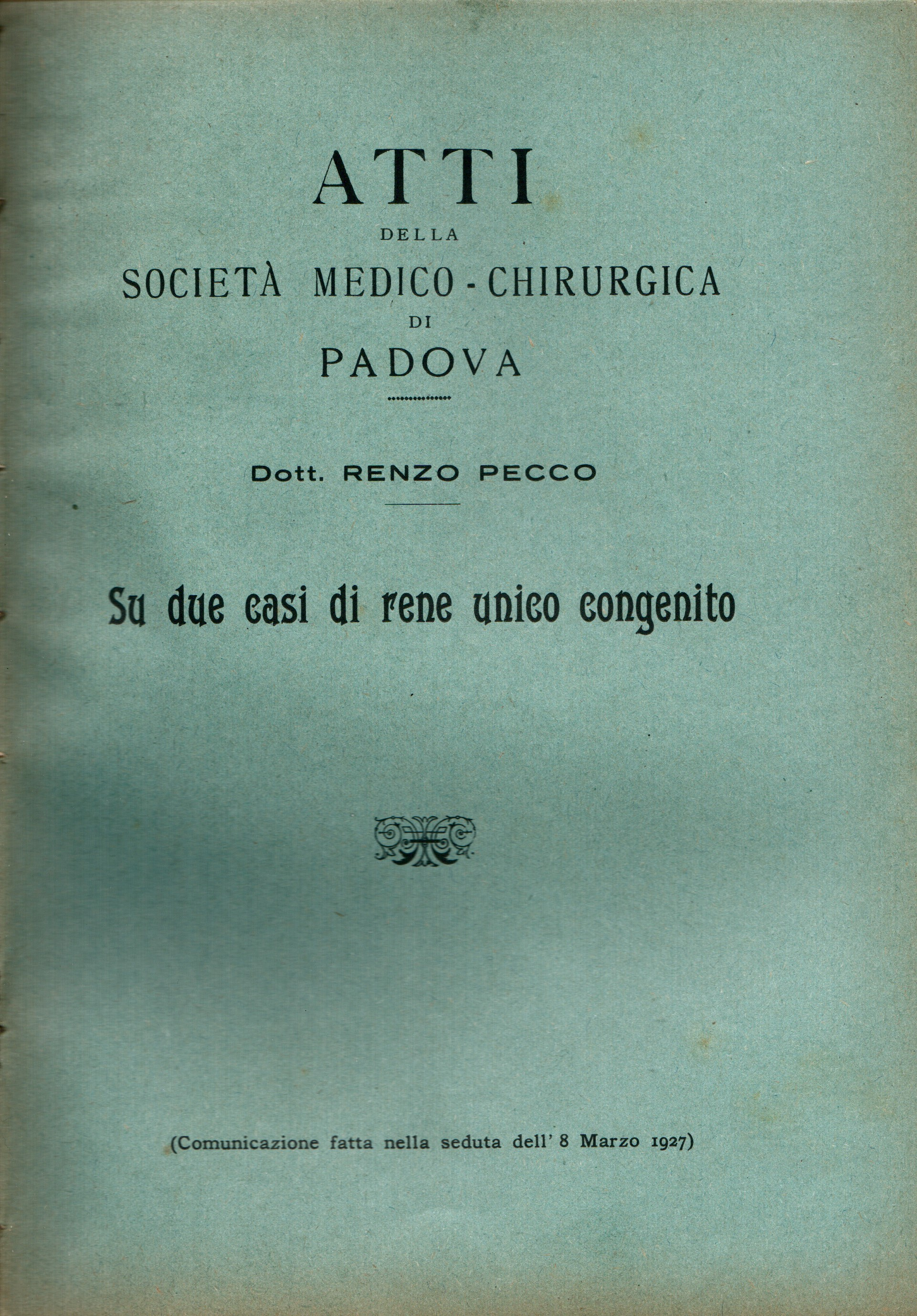
Article "On two cases of congenital solitary kidney" of Renzo Pecco

He published over a hundred medical articles, especially during the period of 'Donati's school', mainly regarding surgical procedures on the gall bladder, kidneys and abdominal region.

The "Renzo Pecco scholarship", rewards deserving minds in medicine.

A street was named after him in Como.

== Sources ==
- Castelnuovo M-N, The surgical art of Renzo Pecco (1900–75), "Biografie Mediche", year 2014, numero 3, pagg 42–44 – language: Italian
