= USNS Pecos (T-AO-197) =

Oiler of the United States Navy

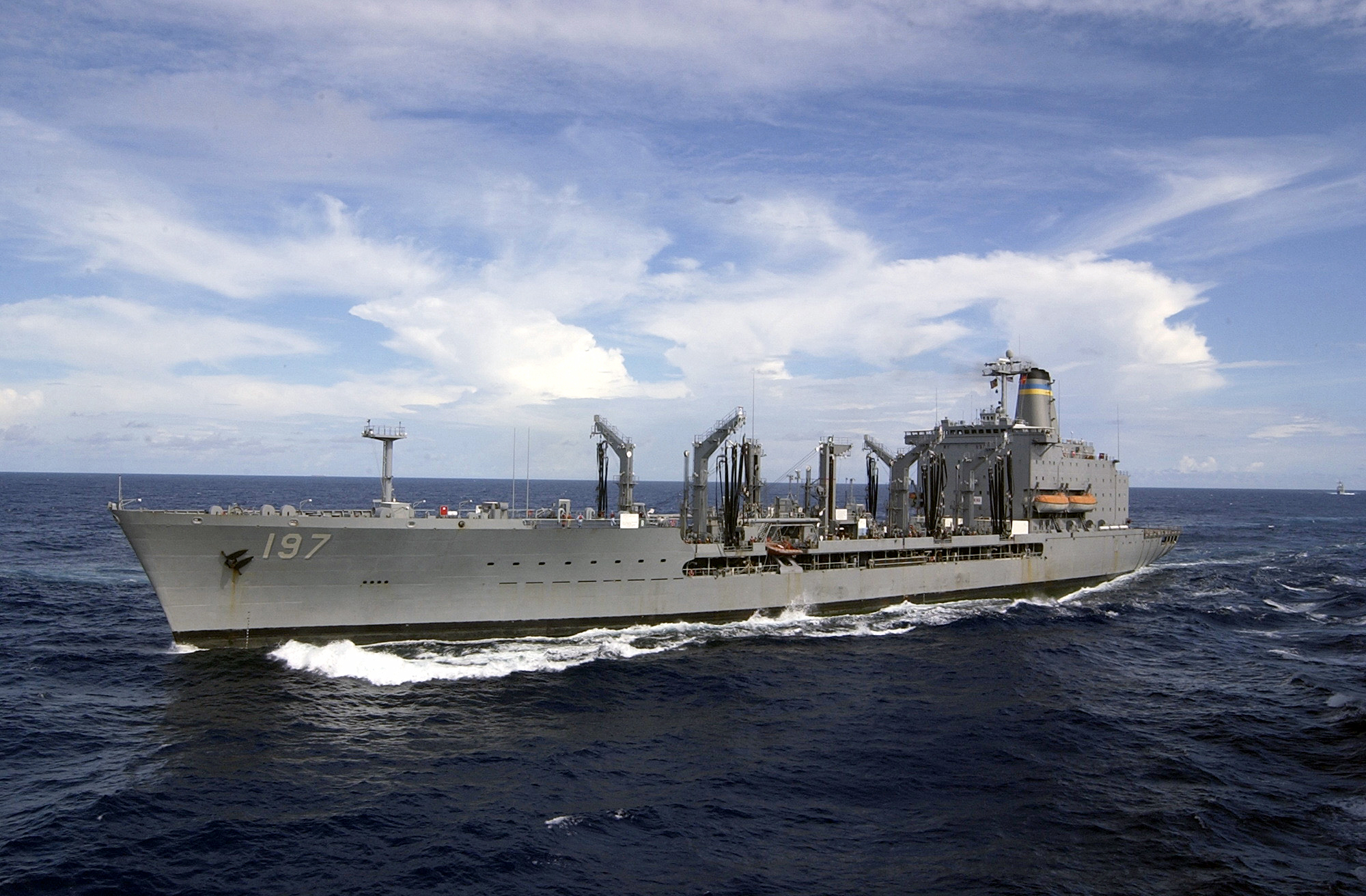
- USNS Pecos (T-AO-197)

History

United States
- Name: USNS Pecos
- Namesake: The Pecos River in New Mexico and Texas
- Ordered: 12 February 1987
- Builder: Avondale Shipyard, Inc., New Orleans, Louisiana
- Laid down: 17 February 1988
- Launched: 23 September 1989
- In service: 6 July 1990
- Out of service: 31 July 2026
- Identification: IMO number: 8706686; MMSI number: 367220000; Callsign: NPEC
- Honors and awards: The National Defense Service Medal; The Armed Forces Expeditionary Medal (twice); The Southwest Asia Service Medal.
- Status: Inactive

General characteristics
- Class & type: Henry J. Kaiser-class replenishment oiler
- Type: Fleet replenishment oiler
- Tonnage: 31,200 deadweight tons
- Displacement: 9,500 tons light; Full load variously reported as 42,382 tons and 40,700 long tons (41,400 metric tons)
- Length: 677 ft (206 m)
- Beam: 97 ft 5 in (29.69 m)
- Draft: 35 ft (11 m) maximum
- Installed power: 16,000 hp (11.9 MW) per shaft; 34,442 hp (25.7 MW) total sustained
- Propulsion: Two medium-speed Colt-Pielstick PC4-2/2 10V-570 diesel engines, two shafts, controllable-pitch propellers
- Speed: 20 knots (37 km/h; 23 mph)
- Capacity: 178,000 to 180,000 barrels (28,300 to 28,600 m^{3}) of fuel oil and jet fuel; 7,400 square feet (690 m^{2}) dry cargo space; eight 20-foot (6.1 m) refrigerated containers with room for 128 pallets
- Complement: approx. 88 (18 civilian officers, 1 U.S. Navy Chief Petty Officer, 64 merchant mariners, ~5 U.S. Navy enlisted personnel)
- Armament: Peacetime: usually none; Wartime: crew-served machine guns via embarked security detachment
- Aircraft carried: None
- Aviation facilities: Helicopter landing platform
- Notes: Five refueling stations; Two dry cargo transfer rigs

USNS Pecos (T-AO-197) is a Henry J. Kaiser-class underway replenishment oiler operated by the Military Sealift Command to support ships of the United States Navy, and the third such ship to be named after the Pecos River.

Pecos, the eleventh Henry J. Kaiser-class ship, was laid down on 17 February 1988 at Avondale Shipyards in New Orleans, Louisiana, and launched on 23 September 1989. She was delivered to the Navy and placed in non-commissioned service with a primarily civilian crew under the control of the Military Sealift Command on 6 July 1990. The ship is equipped with a helicopter platform to allow for at-sea transfer of personnel and supplies.

Pecos is part of the MSC Naval Auxiliary Force, MSC Pacific, in the United States Pacific Fleet, and has received the National Defense Service Medal, the Armed Forces Expeditionary Medal twice, and the Southwest Asia Service Medal.

== History ==
In May 1994, Pecos collided with USS Reuben James during a replenishment operation in the Persian Gulf.

On 9 December 1999 a United States Marine Corps CH-46 Sea Knight helicopter crashed into Pecos and sank while participating in a training mission. Seven of the 18 personnel on board the helicopter were killed in the accident.

During Operation Tomodachi, Pecos rendezvoused with United States Seventh Fleet flagship USS Blue Ridge near Kyushu, Japan. Blue Ridge transferred 96 pallets of humanitarian assistance and disaster relief material to Pecos for delivery to the Essex Amphibious Group and Carrier Strike Group 5. Weighing as much as 1,000 pounds (450 kg) each, the pallets contained water containers and water purification tablets, first-aid products, tarpaulins, blankets, and other supplies. The ship arrived off Sendai on 25 March for more underway replenishment operations. During her support effort to Operation Tomodachi, Pecos completed nine underway replenishments and delivered more than 2.3 million U.S. gallons (8.7 million liters) of fuel to other supporting ships. Pecos helped refuel USS Harry S. Truman and HMS Defender in 2016.

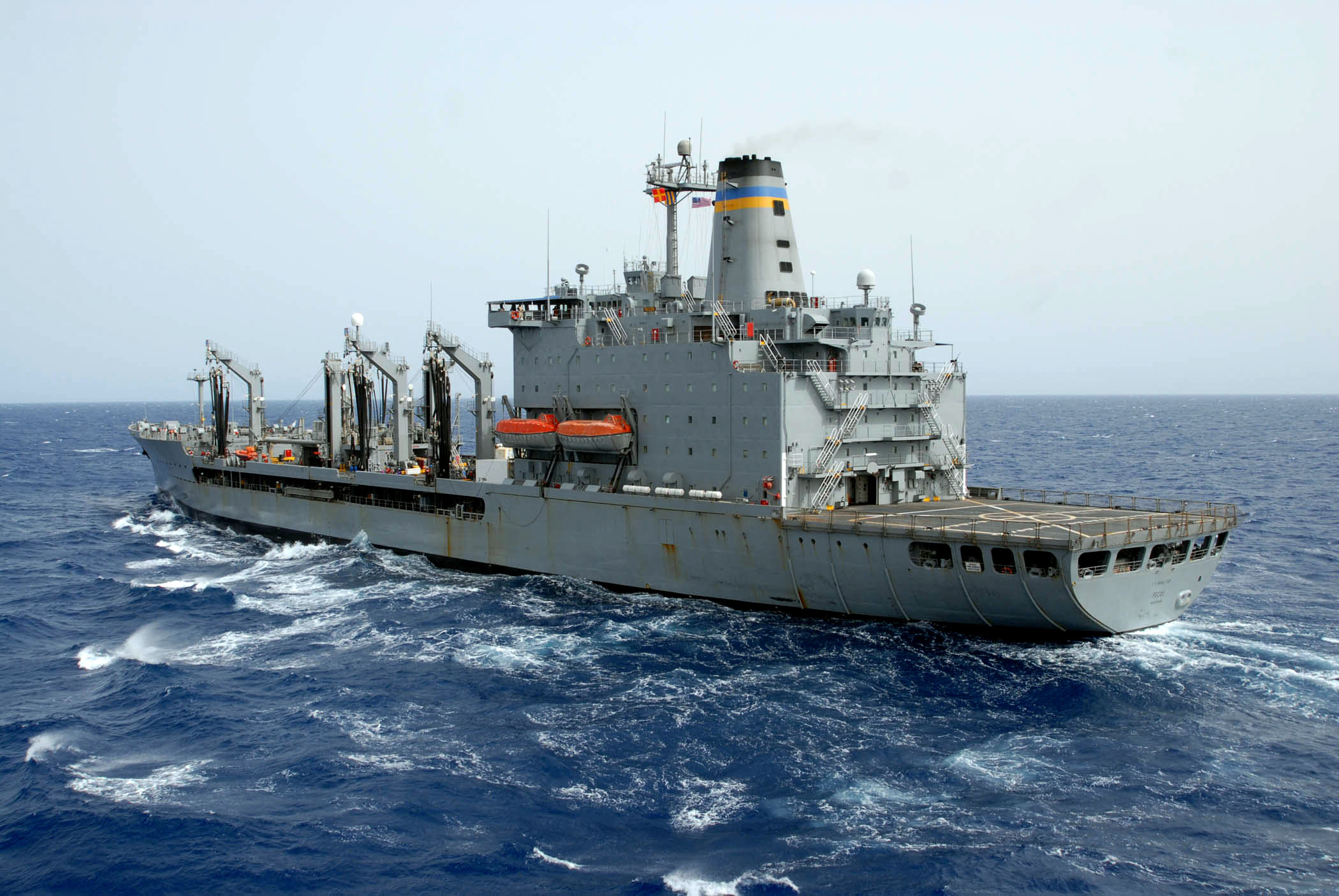
Pecos (T-AO-197) attempting to replenish the guided-missile destroyer USS Ross (DDG-71).

On 28 November 2018, the United States Navy sent Pecos and USS Stockdale through the Taiwan Strait as a demonstration of the "U.S. commitment to a free and open Indo-Pacific," according to a U.S. Pacific Fleet spokesman. The transit took place only a few days before a planned meeting between U.S. President Donald Trump and Chinese Communist Party leader Xi Jinping at the G20 summit in Buenos Aires, Argentina.

== Fate ==
On 9 October 2024, Pecos departed from San Diego enroute to be deactivated and taken out of service on the US East Coast. Pecos was planned to be deactivated from 20 January 2025 to 4 May 2025 at Detyens Shipyards, North Charleston, SC.

The Navy announced it would transfer the USNS Pecos on 31 July 2026 to the US Maritime Administration.
