= Ulsan (disambiguation) =

Ulsan is an industrial and port city in Yeongnam, South Korea

Ulsan or Ul-San, may also refer to:

== Places ==
- Ulsan Rock, Seorak Mountain, Seoraksan National Park, Sokcho, Gangwon, South Korea; a mountain prominence

=== In Yeongnam ===
- Ulsan Castle, a Japanese castle, in the historic origin of Ulsan city
- Port of Ulsan, in the city of Ulsan
- Ulsan Airport, an airport serving the city of Ulsan
- Ulsan Station, a high-speed rail station in the city of Ulsan
- Ulsan Bridge, over the Taehwa River in the city of Ulsan
- Ulsan Expressway, an expressway within the city of Ulsan
- Ulsan Stadium, a sports complex in the city of Ulsan, that replaced the demolished Ulsan Public Stadium
- Ulsan Public Stadium, a demolished sports complex in the city of Ulsan, replaced by the Ulsan Stadium

== Groups, organizations ==
- Ulsan Metropolitan Council for the city of Ulsan, Yeongnam, South Korea
- Ulsan College, a private college in the city of Ulsan, Yeongnam, South Korea
- University of Ulsan, a private university in the city of Ulsan, Yeongnam, South Korea

== Battles ==
- Battle off Ulsan (1904) between Japan and Russia, off Ulsan, Yeongnam, South Korea
- Siege of Ulsan (early 1598) between Joseon and Japan, at Ulsan, Yeongnam, South Korea
- Second siege of Ulsan (late 1598) between Joseon and Japan, at Ulsan, Yeongnam, South Korea

== Vehicular ==
- Ulsan-class frigate, a ROKN frigate class of South Korea
- ROKS Ulsan (FF-951), a ROKN frigate of South Korea, lead ship in the eponymous class of frigate
- ROKS Ulsan (AKL-910), a ROKN cargoship of South Korea, alternate name of USS Brule (AKL-28) while under South Korean service

== Other uses ==
- Ulsan (gamer) (born 2000; Korean: 임수훈, romanized: Lim Soo-hoon), South Korean esports videogamer specializing in Tekken

== See also ==
- Busan-Ulsan Metropolitan Area, Yeongnam, South Korea
- Battle of Ulsan (set index), several battles
- ROKS Ulsan, a ROKN ship name, used by South Korea, the name of several ships
- Ul (disambiguation)
- San (disambiguation)
