= ROKS Chungnam =

ROKS Chungnam is the name of three Republic of Korea Navy warships:

- ROKS Chungnam (DE-821), a Rudderow-class destroyer escort from 1963 to 1984.
- ROKS Chungnam (FF-953), an Ulsan-class frigate from 1986 to 2017.
- ROKS Chungnam (FFG-828), a Chungnam-class frigate launched in 2023.
