= ROKS Jeonnam =

ROKS Jeonnam is the name of two Republic of Korea Navy warships:

- ROKS Jeonnam (APD-827), a Buckley-class destroyer escort from 1967 to 1986.
- ROKS Jeonnam (FF-957), a Ulsan-class frigate from 1988 to present.
