= ROKS Gyeongbuk =

ROKS Gyeongbuk is the name of two Republic of Korea Navy warships:

- ROKS Gyeongbuk (APD-826), a Buckley-class destroyer escort from 1967 to 1985.
- ROKS Gyeongbuk (FF-956), a Ulsan-class frigate from 1986 to 2019.
