= ROKS Busan =

ROKS Busan is the name of two Republic of Korea Navy warships:

- ROKS Busan (DD-913), a Chungmu-class destroyer from 1968 to 1989.
- ROKS Busan (FF-959), a Ulsan-class frigate from 1993 to present.
