= ROKS Jeju =

ROKS Jeju is the name of two Republic of Korea Navy warships:

- ROKS Jeju (APD-828), a Crosley-class high speed transport from 1967 to 1989.
- ROKS Jeju (FF-958), a Ulsan-class frigate from 1990 to present.
