= ROKS Ulsan =

ROKS Ulsan is the name of two Republic of Korea Navy warships:

- ROKS Ulsan (AKL-910), a light cargo ship commissioned as USS Brule (AKL-28) in 1952, and loaned to ROK Navy in 1971
- ROKS Ulsan (FF-951), an Ulsan-class frigate commissioned on 1 January 1981
