= Chongju (disambiguation) =

Chongju is a city in North P'yŏngan province, North Korea.

Chongju or Jeongju may also refer to:

- Chongju, the former name of Chongpyong County, North Korea
- Ch'ŏngju, a former place in Korea in modern-day Kaepung-guyok, North Korea
- Jeongju, the former name of Jeongeup, South Korea.

== See also ==
- Cheongju (disambiguation), for articles that would be romanized as Ch'ŏngju in McCune–Reischauer
