= Naka Muzzafra =

- Industrial area
- Nickname: NMR
- Country: India
- State: Uttar Pradesh
- Founder: 1809
- Named for: Muzzafraiya
- Elevation: 1,346 m (4,416 ft)

Population (2011)
  - Total: 65,790
  - Rank: 3

Languages
  - Official: Hindi, Awadhi, English
- Time zone: UTC+5:30 (IST)
- PIN: 204001
- Vehicle registration: UP 42
- Sex ratio: 1000/1001 ♂/♀
- Website: up.gov.in

Naka Muzzafra is an industrial area in Ayodhya city in the Indian state of Uttar Pradesh and is subpost office of Ayodhya.

== Demographics ==
As of 2011 India census, Naka Muzzafra had a population of 65,790. Males constitute 51% of the population and females 49%. Naka Muzzafra has an average literacy rate of 62%, higher than the national average of 59.5%: male literacy is 71%, and female literacy is 52%. In Naka Muzzafra, 17% of the population is under 6 years of age.

Religions in Naka Muzzafra
| Religion | Percent |
| Hindus | 85% |
| Muslims | 5% |
| Jains | 10% |
| Others† | 0% |
Distribution of religions †Includes Sikhs (0%), Buddhists (<0%).
