= Busan–Gyeongnam Area =

Metropolitan area in *Busan *Ulsan *Changwon *Yangsan *Gimhae, South Korea

- Metropolitan area
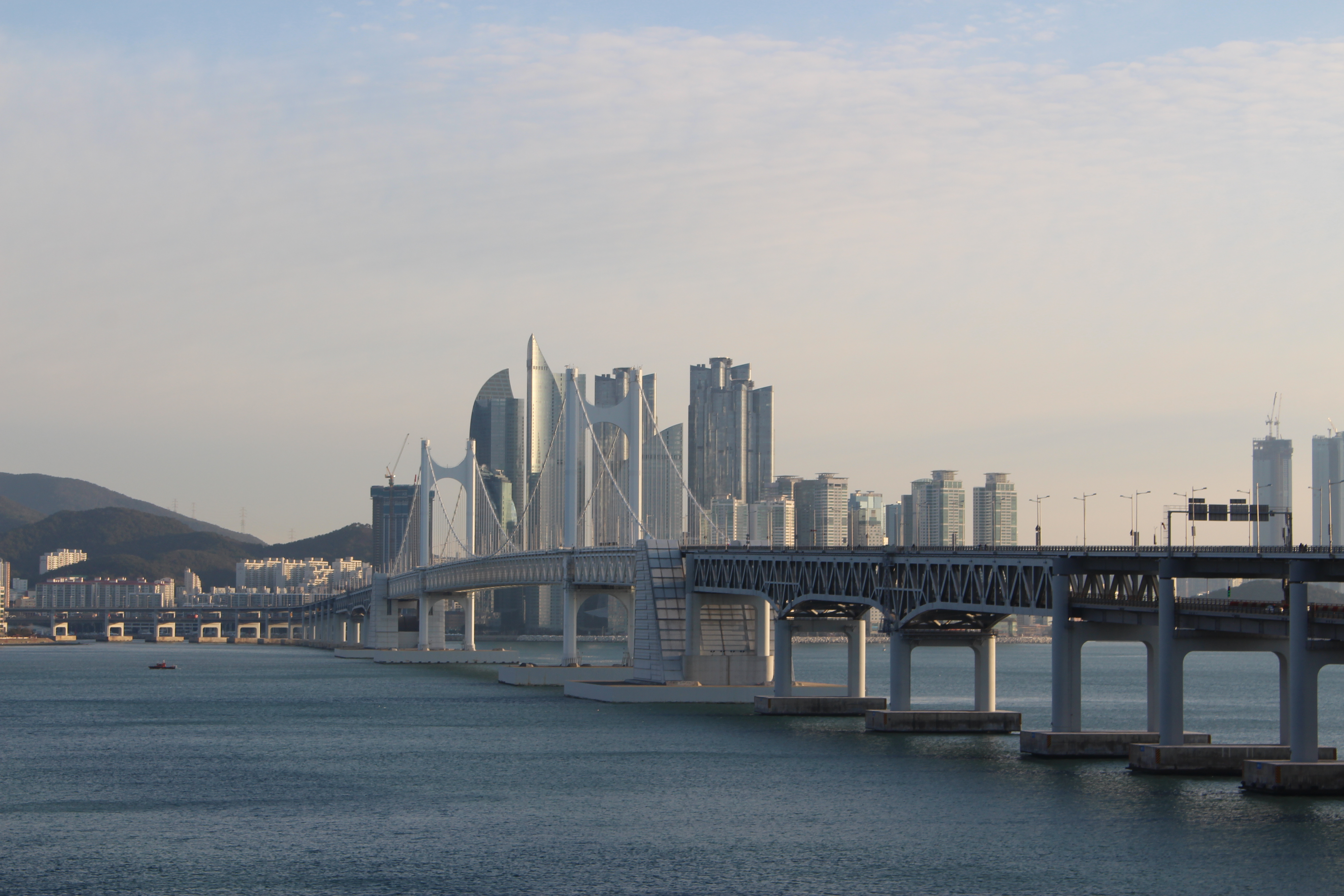
- Downtown Busan
- Nickname: PK
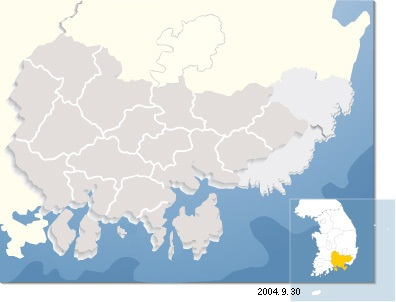
- Country: South Korea
- Major Cities: Busan; Ulsan; Changwon; Yangsan; Gimhae

Area
  - Metro: 12,360 km^{2} (4,770 sq mi)

Population (2010)
  - Metro: 7,584,435
  - Metro density: 613.6/km^{2} (1,589/sq mi)

GDP
  - Metro: KR₩342 trillion (US$298.96 billion) (2022)

Korean name
- Hangul: 부경권
- Hanja: 釜慶圈
- RR: Bugyeonggwon
- MR: Pugyŏngkwŏn

PK
- Hangul: 부경
- Hanja: 釜慶
- RR: Bugyeong
- MR: Pugyŏng

PUK
- Hangul: 부울경
- Hanja: 釜蔚慶
- RR: Buulgyeong
- MR: Puulgyŏng

Southeast Area
- Hangul: 동남권
- Hanja: 東南圈
- RR: Dongnamgwon
- MR: Tongnamkwŏn

Busan–Gyeongnam Area, also known as Pusan–Kyŏngnam (PK) is the metropolitan area of Busan, Ulsan, and Gyeongsangnam-do (Gyeongnam) located in southeast South Korea. Now it is called Buulgyeong.

== History ==
Until 1963, before Busan become a "Directly Governed City", the whole area formed the Gyeongsangnam-do.

== Economy ==
Subdivision	Area km^{2}	Population (2022)	GDP (KR₩)	GDP (US$)
South Gyeongsang Province	10,533	3,290,991	₩ 138 trillion	US$ 110 billion
Busan	770	3,331,444	₩ 114 trillion	US$ 91 billion
Ulsan	1,057	1,113,707	₩ 90 trillion	US$ 72 billion
Busan–Gyeongnam Area	12,360	7,735,893	₩ 342 trillion	US$ 274 billion

== Population ==
PK has a population of 7,584,435, as of 2010. It is the second most populated metropolitan area after the Seoul Metropolitan Area.

== Administrative districts ==
=== Metropolitan cities ===
- Busan
- Ulsan

=== South Gyeongsang Province ===
- Changwon
- Yangsan
- Gimhae
- Jinju
- Sacheon
- Miryang
- Geoje
- Tongyeong

== See also ==
- List of metropolitan areas by population
- Seoul Capital Area
- Southeastern Maritime Industrial Region
