= Industrial zone =

Industrial zone can refer to:

- Industrial park, an area zoned for industrial development
- Industrial region, a part of a country with high industrial development
- Industrial zoning, the practice of designating an area for industrial development
