= ROKS Jeonnam (FF-957) =

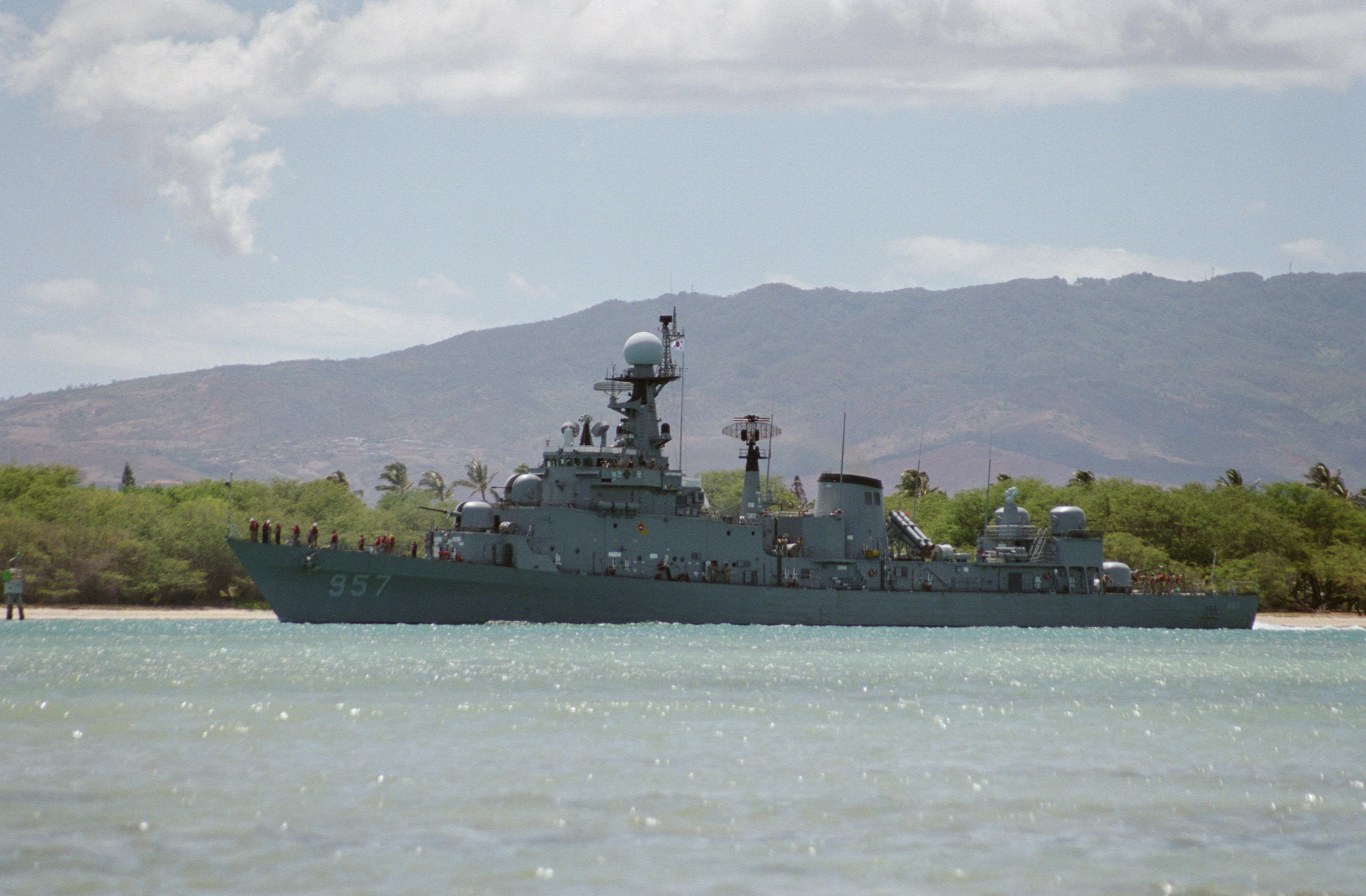
- ROKS Jeonnam in Pearl Harbor on 6 June 2000

History

South Korea
- Name: Jeonnam; (전남)
- Namesake: Jeonnam
- Builder: Hyundai Heavy Industries
- Launched: 19 April 1988
- Commissioned: 17 June 1988
- Decommissioned: 30 December 2022
- Identification: Hull number: FF-957
- Status: Decommissioned

General characteristics
- Class & type: Ulsan-class frigate
- Displacement: 1,500 tonnes (1,476 long tons) light; 2,215 tonnes (2,180 long tons) full load
- Length: 103.7 m (340 ft 3 in)
- Beam: 12.5 m (41 ft 0 in)
- Draught: 3.8 m (12 ft 6 in)
- Propulsion: CODOG; 2 x General Electric LM-2500; 2 x MTU 12V 956 TB82
- Speed: 34 knots (63 km/h; 39 mph)
- Range: 8,000 nmi (15,000 km; 9,200 mi) at 16 knots (30 km/h; 18 mph)
- Complement: 186 (16 officers)
- Sensors & processing systems: Signaal DA-08 air surveillance radar; AN/SPS-10C navigation radar; ST-1802 fire control radar; Signaal PHS-32 hull-mounted sonar; TB-261K towed sonar
- Electronic warfare & decoys: ULQ-11K ESM/ECM suite; 2 x Mark 36 SRBOC 6-tubed chaff/flare launcher; 2 x 15-tube SLQ-261 torpedo acoustic countermeasures
- Armament: 8 × Harpoon (2 quadruple launchers) anti-ship missile; 6 × 324 mm (12.8 in) Blue Shark torpedo (2 triple tubes); 2 × Otobreda 76 mm (3 in)/62 cal. gun; 3 × Otobreda 40 mm (1.6 in)/70 cal. (2 twin) compact CIWS

ROKS Jeonnam (FF-957) is the sixth ship of the Ulsan-class frigate in the Republic of Korea Navy. She is named after the province, Jeonnam.

== Development ==
In the early 1990s, the Korean government plan for the construction of next generation coastal ships named Frigate 2000 was scrapped due to the 1997 Asian financial crisis. But the decommissioning of the Gearing-class destroyers and the aging fleet of Ulsan-class frigates, the plan was revived as the Future Frigate eXperimental, also known as FFX in the early 2000s.

10 ships were launched and commissioned from 1980 to 1993. They have 3 different variants which consists of Flight I, Flight II and Flight III.

== Construction and career ==
ROKS Jeonnam was launched on 19 April 1988 by Hyundai Heavy Industries and commissioned on 17 June 1988.

She participated in RIMPAC 1992.

She participated in RIMPAC 1998.

She participated in RIMPAC 2000.

Decommissioned 30 December 2022.

As of August 2023, the ship was laid up at Mokpo North port awaiting scrapping.
