= Cheongju (disambiguation) =

Cheongju is a city in North Chungcheong province, South Korea.

Cheongju may also refer to:

- Cheongju (beverage), a variety of Korean rice wine
- Cheongju, a Silla province with its capital at present-day Jinju
- ROKS Cheongju (FF-961), a frigate of the South Korean navy
- Battle of Cheongju
- Cheongju International Airport
- Chungbuk Cheongju FC
- Cheongju University
