= ROKS Chungnam (FF-953) =

Ulsan-class frigate

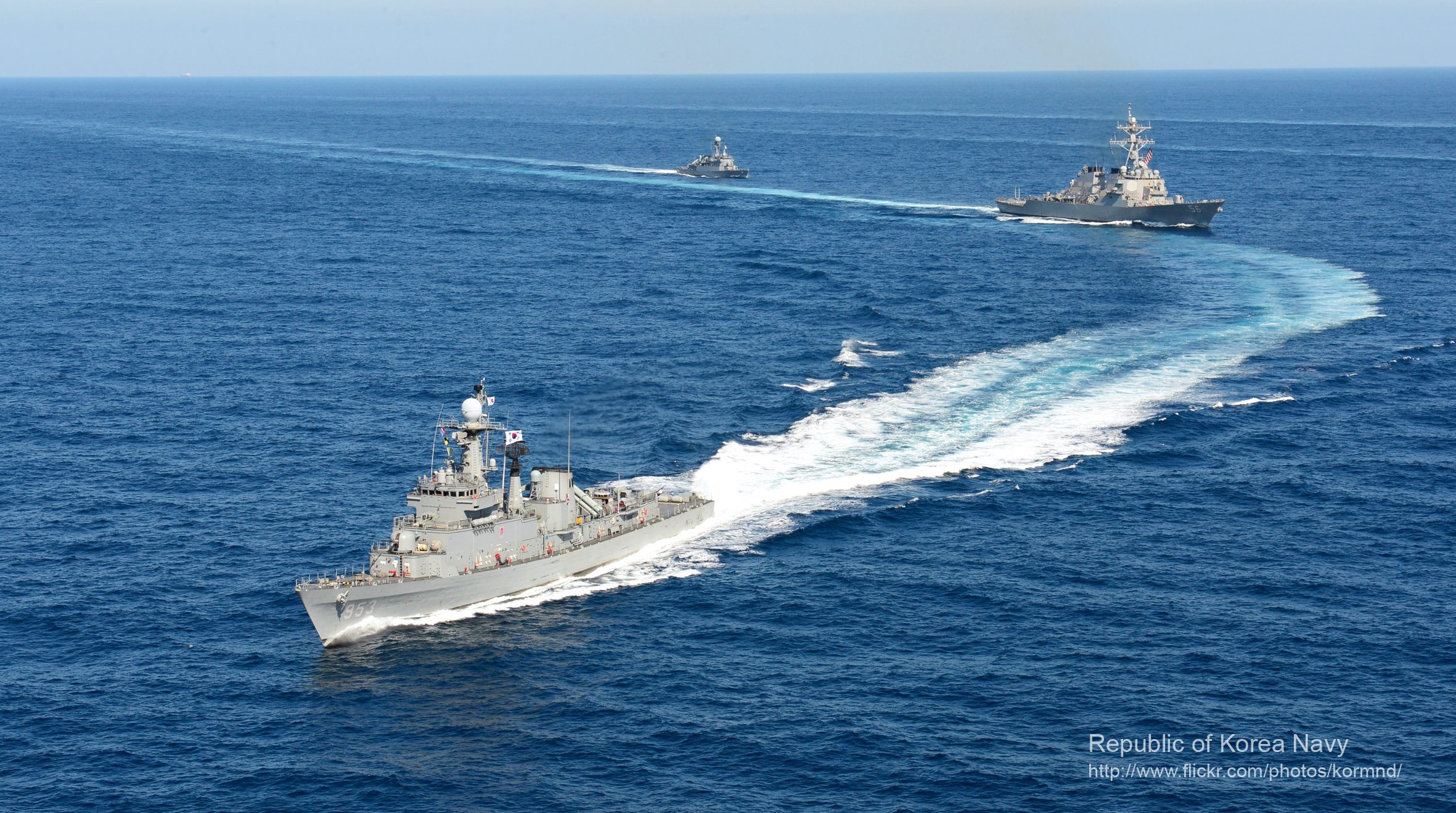
- ROKS Chungnam on 21 March 2013

History

South Korea
- Name: Chungnam; (충남)
- Namesake: Chungnam
- Builder: Hanjin
- Launched: 26 October 1984
- Commissioned: 1 June 1986
- Decommissioned: 27 December 2017
- Identification: Hull number: FF-953
- Status: Decommissioned

General characteristics
- Class & type: Ulsan-class frigate
- Displacement: 1,500 tonnes (1,476 long tons) light; 2,215 tonnes (2,180 long tons) full load
- Length: 103.7 m (340 ft 3 in)
- Beam: 12.5 m (41 ft 0 in)
- Draught: 3.8 m (12 ft 6 in)
- Propulsion: CODOG; 2 x General Electric LM-2500; 2 x MTU 12V 956 TB82
- Speed: 34 knots (63 km/h; 39 mph)
- Range: 8,000 nmi (15,000 km; 9,200 mi) at 16 knots (30 km/h; 18 mph)
- Complement: 186 (16 officers)
- Sensors & processing systems: Signaal DA-08 air surveillance radar; AN/SPS-10C navigation radar; ST-1802 fire control radar; Signaal PHS-32 hull-mounted sonar; TB-261K towed sonar
- Electronic warfare & decoys: ULQ-11K ESM/ECM suite; 2 x Mark 36 SRBOC 6-tubed chaff/flare launcher; 2 x 15-tube SLQ-261 torpedo acoustic countermeasures
- Armament: 2 × Otobreda 76 mm (3 in)/62 cal. gun; 4 × Emerson EMERLEC 30 twin-barrel turret for two Oerlikon 30 mm/75 KCB cannons; 2 × Mk.32 SVTT 324 mm (12.8 in) triple-tubed torpedo launchers for Chung Sang Eo torpedoes; 8 × Harpoon Block 1C (2 quadruple launchers) anti-ship cruise missiles; 8 × Harpoon Block 1C (2 quadruple launchers) anti-ship cruise missiles

ROKS Chungnam (FF-953) is the third ship of the Ulsan-class frigate in the Republic of Korea Navy. She is named after the province, Chungnam.

== Development ==
In the early 1990s, the Korean government plan for the construction of next generation coastal ships named Frigate 2000 was scrapped due to the 1997 Asian financial crisis. But the decommissioning of the Gearing-class destroyers and the aging fleet of Ulsan-class frigates, the plan was revived as the Future Frigate eXperimental, also known as FFX in the early 2000s.

10 ships were launched and commissioned from 1980 to 1993. They have 3 different variants which consists of Flight I, Flight II and Flight III.

== Construction and career ==
ROKS Chungnam was launched on 26 October 1984 by Hanjin Heavy Industries and commissioned on 1 June 1986.

She was decommissioned on 27 December 2017 and expected to be used as a training ship.
