= ROKS Cheongju =

Ulsan-class frigate

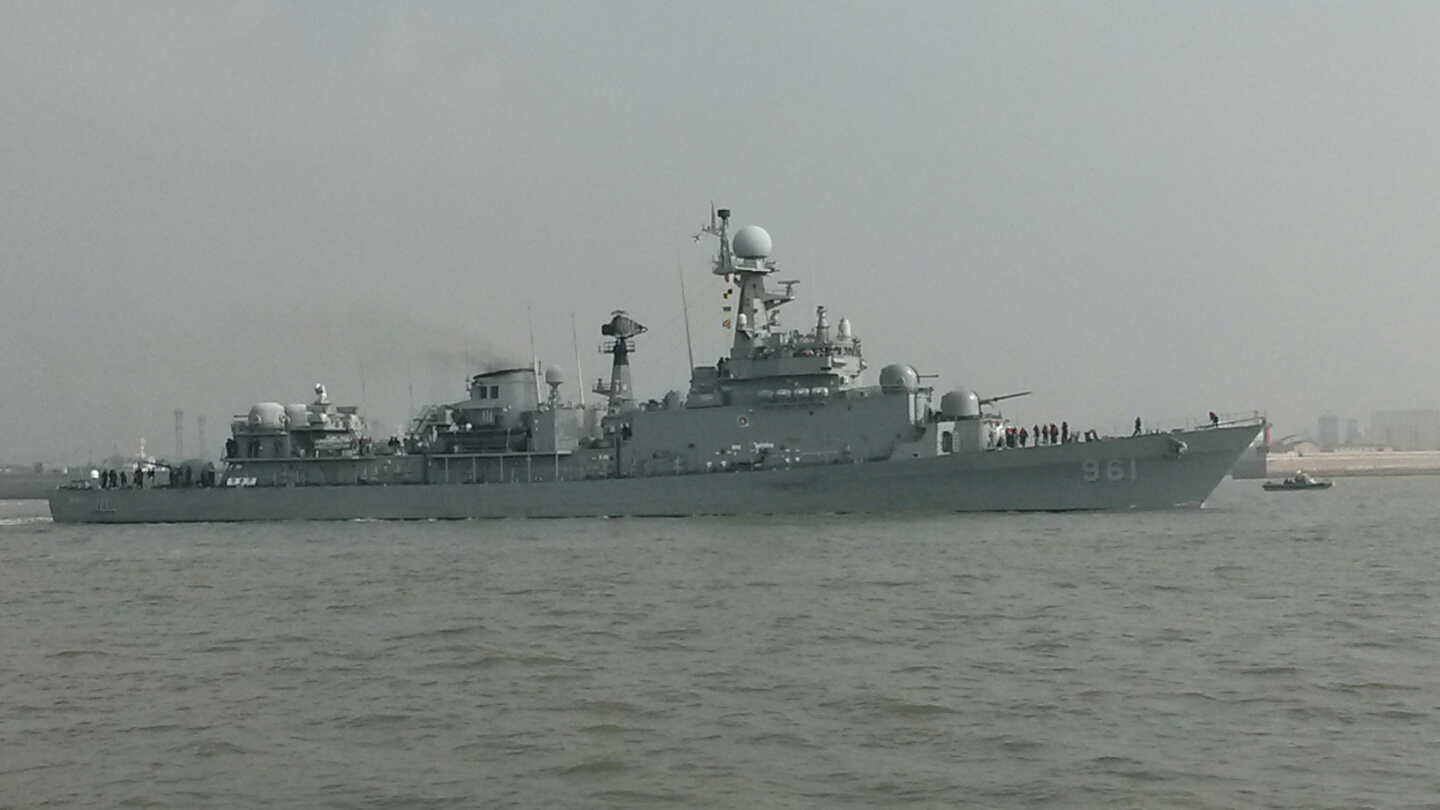
- ROKS Cheongju on 10 November 2015

History

South Korea
- Name: Cheongju; (청주)
- Namesake: Cheongju
- Builder: DSME
- Launched: 20 March 1992
- Commissioned: 1 June 1993
- Identification: Callsign: HLDY; Hull number: FF-961
- Status: Active

General characteristics
- Class & type: Ulsan-class frigate
- Displacement: 1,500 tonnes (1,476 long tons) light; 2,215 tonnes (2,180 long tons) full load
- Length: 103.7 m (340 ft 3 in)
- Beam: 12.5 m (41 ft 0 in)
- Draught: 3.8 m (12 ft 6 in)
- Propulsion: CODOG; 2 x General Electric LM-2500; 2 x MTU 12V 956 TB82
- Speed: 34 knots (63 km/h; 39 mph)
- Range: 8,000 nmi (15,000 km; 9,200 mi) at 16 knots (30 km/h; 18 mph)
- Complement: 186 (16 officers)
- Sensors & processing systems: Signaal DA-08 air surveillance radar; AN/SPS-10C navigation radar; ST-1802 fire control radar; Signaal PHS-32 hull-mounted sonar; TB-261K towed sonar
- Electronic warfare & decoys: ULQ-11K ESM/ECM suite; 2 x Mark 36 SRBOC 6-tubed chaff/flare launcher; 2 x 15-tube SLQ-261 torpedo acoustic countermeasures
- Armament: 8 × Harpoon (2 quadruple launchers) anti-ship missile; 6 × 324 mm (12.8 in) Blue Shark torpedo (2 triple tubes); 2 × Otobreda 76 mm (3 in)/62 cal. gun; 3 × Otobreda 40 mm (1.6 in)/70 cal. (2 twin) compact CIWS

ROKS Cheongju (FF-961) is the ninth ship of the Ulsan-class frigate in the Republic of Korea Navy. She is named after the city, Cheongju.

== Development ==
10 ships were launched and commissioned from 1980 to 1993. They have 3 different variants which consists of Flight I, Flight II and Flight III.

== Construction and career ==
ROKS Cheongju was launched on 20 March 1992 by Daewoo Shipbuilding and commissioned on 1 June 1993.
