= ROKS Ulsan (FF-951) =

Ulsan-class frigate

Coordinates: 35.5017137°N 129.3833651°E

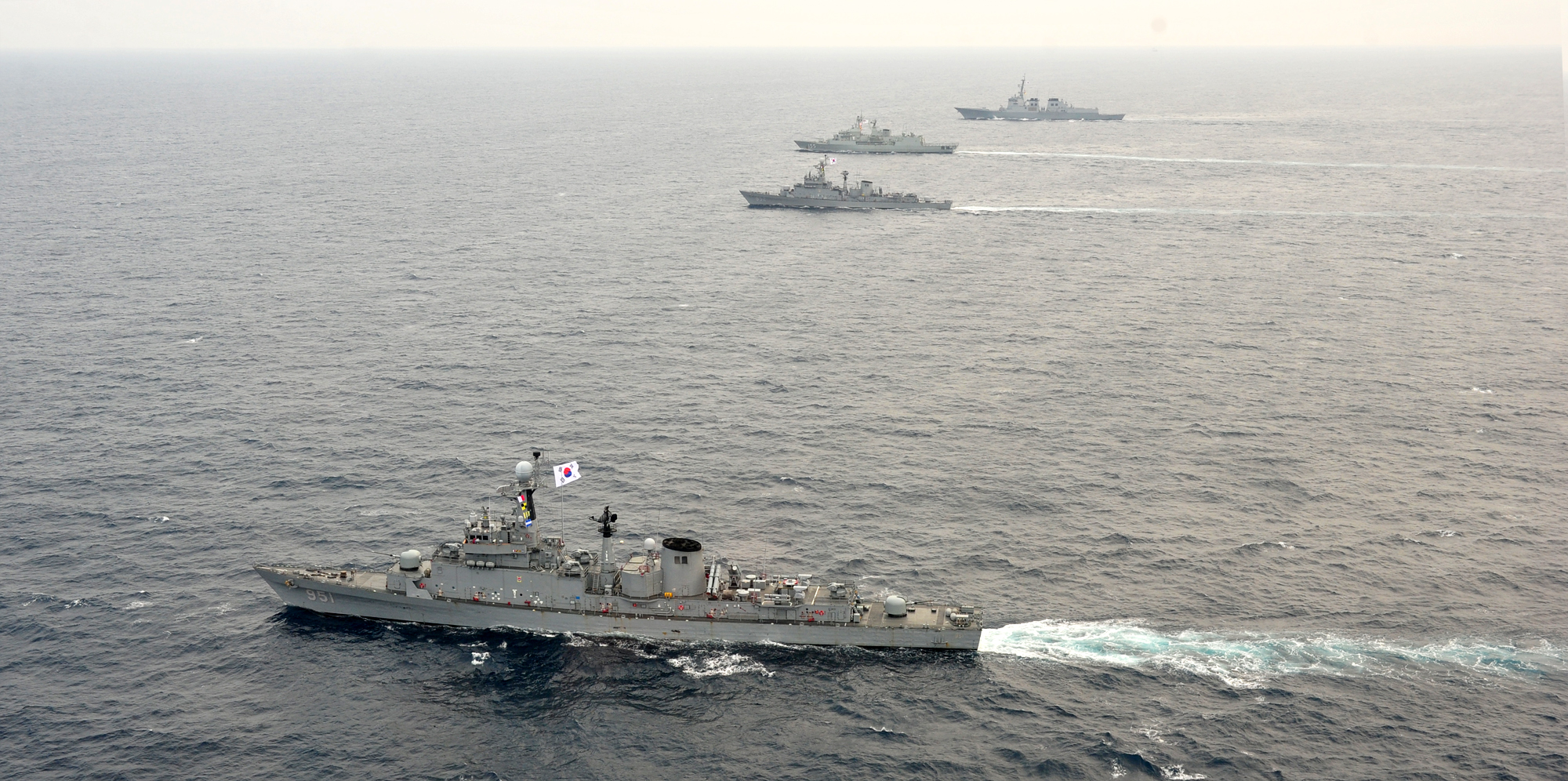
- ROKS Ulsan on 28 May 2012

History

South Korea
- Name: Ulsan; (울산)
- Namesake: Ulsan
- Builder: Hyundai
- Launched: 8 April 1980
- Commissioned: 30 December 1980
- Decommissioned: 30 December 2014
- Identification: Hull number: FF-951
- Status: Museum ship in Ulsan City

General characteristics
- Class & type: Ulsan-class frigate
- Displacement: 1,500 tonnes (1,476 long tons) light; 2,180 tonnes (2,146 long tons) full load
- Length: 103.7 m (340 ft 3 in)
- Beam: 12.5 m (41 ft 0 in)
- Draught: 3.8 m (12 ft 6 in)
- Propulsion: CODOG; 2 x General Electric LM-2500; 2 x MTU 12V 956 TB82
- Speed: 34 knots (63 km/h; 39 mph)
- Range: 8,000 nmi (15,000 km; 9,200 mi) at 16 knots (30 km/h; 18 mph)
- Complement: 186 (16 officers)
- Sensors & processing systems: Signaal DA-08 air surveillance radar; AN/SPS-10C navigation radar; ST-1802 fire control radar; Signaal PHS-32 hull-mounted sonar; TB-261K towed sonar
- Electronic warfare & decoys: ULQ-11K ESM/ECM suite; 2 x Mark 36 SRBOC 6-tubed chaff/flare launcher; 2 x 15-tube SLQ-261 torpedo acoustic countermeasures
- Armament: 2 × Otobreda 76 mm (3 in)/62 cal. gun; 4 × Emerson EMERLEC 30 twin-barrel turret for two Oerlikon 30mm L/75 KCB cannons; 2 × Mk.32 SVTT 324 mm (12.8 in) triple-tube torpedo launchers for Chung Sang Eo torpedoes; 8 × Harpoon Block 1C (2 quadruple launchers) anti-ship cruise missiles

ROKS Ulsan (FF-951) is the lead ship of the Ulsan-class frigate in the Republic of Korea Navy. She is named after the city, Ulsan.

== Development ==
9 ships were launched and commissioned from 1980 to 1993. They have 3 different variants which consists of Flight I, Flight II and Flight III.

== Construction and career ==
ROKS Ulsan was launched on 8 April 1980 by Hyundai Heavy Industries and commissioned on 30 December 1980.

She was decommissioned on 30 December 2014 and placed above ground in Ulsan City as a museum ship.
