= ROKS Gyeongbuk (FF-956) =

Ulsan-class frigate

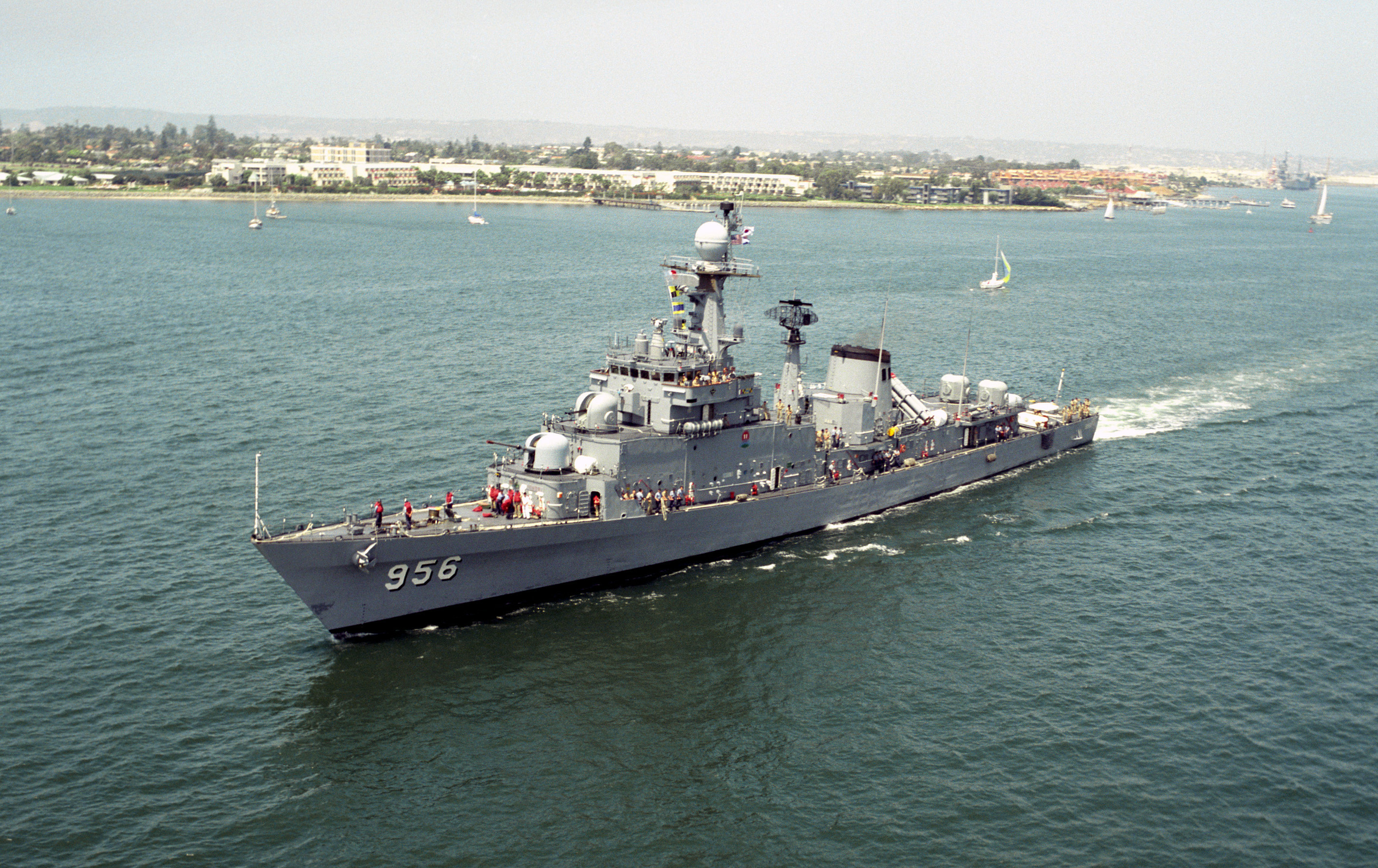
- ROKS Gyeongbuk in San Diego on 1 June 1992

History

South Korea
- Name: Gyeongbuk; (경북)
- Namesake: Gyeongbuk
- Builder: Daewoo Shipbuilding & Marine Engineering
- Launched: 15 January 1986
- Commissioned: 30 May 1986
- Recommissioned: 24 December 2019
- Identification: Hull number: FF-956
- Status: Decommissioned

General characteristics
- Class & type: Ulsan-class frigate
- Displacement: 1,500 tonnes (1,476 long tons) light; 2,215 tonnes (2,180 long tons) full load
- Length: 103.7 m (340 ft 3 in)
- Beam: 12.5 m (41 ft 0 in)
- Draught: 3.8 m (12 ft 6 in)
- Propulsion: CODOG; 2 x General Electric LM-2500; 2 x MTU 12V 956 TB82
- Speed: 34 knots (63 km/h; 39 mph)
- Range: 8,000 nmi (15,000 km; 9,200 mi) at 16 knots (30 km/h; 18 mph)
- Complement: 186 (16 officers)
- Sensors & processing systems: Signaal DA-08 air surveillance radar; AN/SPS-10C navigation radar; ST-1802 fire control radar; Signaal PHS-32 hull-mounted sonar; TB-261K towed sonar
- Electronic warfare & decoys: ULQ-11K ESM/ECM suite; 2 x Mark 36 SRBOC 6-tubed chaff/flare launcher; 2 x 15-tube SLQ-261 torpedo acoustic countermeasures
- Armament: 8 × Harpoon (2 quadruple launchers) anti-ship missile; 6 × 324 mm (12.8 in) Blue Shark torpedo (2 triple tubes); 2 × Otobreda 76 mm (3 in)/62 cal. gun; 3 × Otobreda 40 mm (1.6 in)/70 cal. (2 twin) compact CIWS

ROKS Gyeongbuk (FF-956) is the fifth ship of the Ulsan-class frigate in the Republic of Korea Navy. She is named after the province, Gyeongbuk.

== Development ==
In the early 1990s, the Korean government plan for the construction of next generation coastal ships named Frigate 2000 was scrapped due to the 1997 Asian financial crisis. But the decommissioning of the Gearing-class destroyers and the aging fleet of Ulsan-class frigates, the plan was revived as the Future Frigate eXperimental, also known as FFX in the early 2000s.

10 ships were launched and commissioned from 1980 to 1993. They have 3 different variants which consists of Flight I, Flight II and Flight III.

== Construction and career ==
ROKS Gyeongbuk was launched on 15 January 1986 by Daewoo Shipbuilding and commissioned on 30 May 1986.

She was decommissioned on 24 December 2019 and expected to be used as in training exercises.
