= List of industrial regions =

Geographical regions with a high proportion of industrial use

An industrial region or industrial area is a geographical region with extremely dense industry. It is usually heavily urbanized.

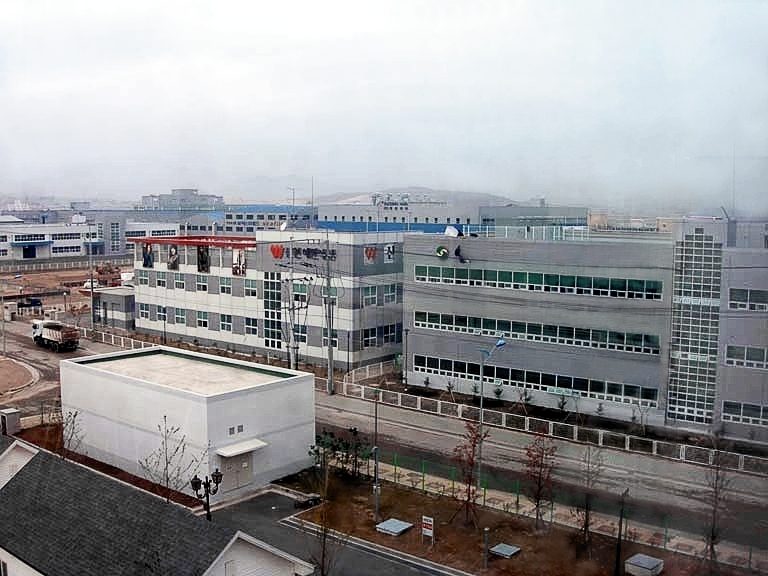
Panorama of North Korea's Kaesong Industrial Region

== Brazil ==
- ABCD Region, sometimes called ABC (ABC paulista or Região do Grande ABC in Portuguese), is an industrial region made up of seven municipalities with the greater metropolitan area of São Paulo, Brazil.

== Bulgaria ==
Industrial region Thracia is an industrial zone made up of several municipalities within the area of Plovdiv, Bulgaria.

== China ==
- Pearl River Delta

== Germany ==
- Ruhr

== Ghana ==
- Tema

== Japan ==
- Keiyō Industrial Zone
- Keihin Industrial Area
- Chūkyō Industrial Area
- Hanshin Industrial Region

== Kazakhstan ==
- Karagandy Region

== Korea ==
- Kaesŏng Industrial Region, North Korea
- Southeastern Maritime Industrial Region, South Korea

== Poland ==
- Białystok Industrial Region
- Bielsko Industrial Region
- Bydgoszcz-Toruń Industrial Region
- Carpathian Industrial Region
- Central Industrial Region
- Częstochowa Industrial Region
- Gdańsk Industrial Region
- Upper Silesian Industrial Region
- Jaworzno-Chrzanów Industrial Region
- Kalisz-Ostrów Industrial Region
- Kraków Industrial Region
- Legnica-Głogów Copper Area
- Lublin Industrial Region
- Łódź Industrial Region
- Olsztyn Industrial Region
- Opole Industrial Region
- Piotrków-Bełchatów Industrial Region
- Poznań Industrial Region
- Rybnik Coal Area
- Old-Polish Industrial Region
- Sudeten Industrial Region
- Szczecin Industrial Region
- Tarnobrzeg Industrial Region
- Tarnów-Rzeszów Industrial Region
- Warsaw Industrial Region
- Wrocław Industrial Region
- Zielona Góra-Żary Industrial Region

== Russia ==
- Kuzbass

== Saudi Arabia ==
- Jubail Industrial City
- Yanbu Industrial City
- Industrial Valley, at King Abdullah Economic City, is part of a fully integrated city on the Red Sea covering an area of 181 million square metres. KAEC's components are King Abdullah Port, Industrial Valley and Coastal Communities.

== Ukraine ==
- Donbas
- Kryvbas

== United States ==
- Rust Belt

== See also ==
- Industrial park
- Metropolitan area
