= USS Brule (AKL-28) =

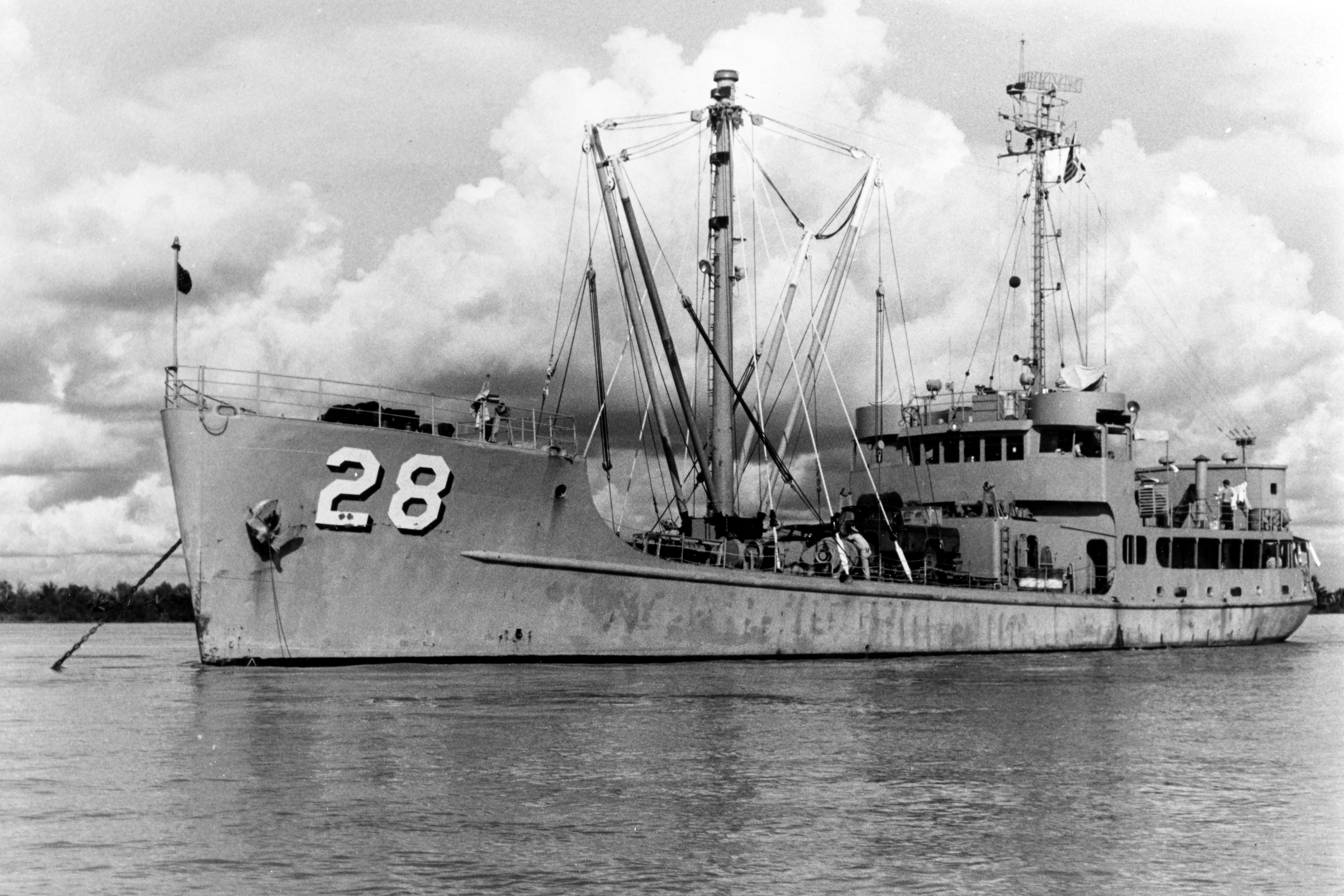
- USS Brule anchored in South Vietnam, September 1966

History

United States
- Name: Brule
- Namesake: Brulé subdivision of the Sioux Indians.
- Builder: Sturgeon Bay Shipbuilding Co.
- Laid down: December 1943
- In service: 1944
- Out of service: Unknown
- Motto: "Service - Our Mission for Freedom"
- Honors and awards: 12 Vietnam Campaign Stars
- Fate: Sold to South Korea, 1974

General characteristics
- Displacement: 550 tons
- Length: 177 ft (54 m)
- Beam: 33 ft (10 m)
- Draft: 10 ft (3.0 m)
- Propulsion: two 500 hp (370 kW) GM Cleveland Division 6-278A 6 cyl V6 diesel engines
- Speed: 13 knots (24 km/h; 15 mph)
- Complement: 5 officers, 43 enlisted
- Armament: Browning M2 12.7 mm heavy machine guns

USS Brule (AKL-28) was a U.S. Army Design 381-A Coastal Freighter of the United States Navy and later the South Korean Navy that saw service during World War II, the Korean War, and the Vietnam War.

== Ship history ==
Brule was laid down in December 1943 for the U.S. Army as Small Freighter FS-370. During construction, she was redesignated as a Produce Freighter, FP-370. She was delivered to the U.S. Army in July 1944.

International radio call sign of USS Brule (AKL-28)
November	Quebec	Delta	Romeo

=== World War II ===
Brule carried provisions to advanced bases occupied by the Army, from Hawaii to the Marshall Islands. In 1945, the ship came under Japanese aircraft attack near the Marinas and received damage and casualties. The crew managed to run the ship aground in shallow water, to prevent sinking. The ship was later re-floated and repaired.

In July 1946, she was used during Operation Crossroads to tow the USS Brule (APA-66) for nuclear weapons testing. She would later bear the same name.

=== Korean War ===
On 1 July 1950, Brule was placed into service by the Military Sea Transportation Service (MSTS) as U.S.N.S. T-AKL-28. On 5 September 1952, T-AKL-28 was named U.S.N.S. Brule (T-AKL-28).

On 31 October 1952, she was accepted by the U.S. Navy at Pearl Harbor, Hawaii and placed in commission as U.S.S. Brule (AKL-28). After completion of training, the Brule proceeded to Guam where on 31 January 1953 she reported to Commander, Service Division 51. Between February 1953 and December 1955, she transported cargo throughout the Pacific. On 31 December 1955, the division was decommissioned and Brule reported to Commander Naval Forces Marianas. On 25 November 1956, Brule proceeded to Subic Bay, beginning a long lengthy career as a shuttle vessel between Subic and Sangley Point.

=== Vietnam War ===
On September 1, 1965, Brule was re-commissioned for service in the Vietnam War. On 4 January 1966, after weeks of training in the Philippines, Brule set sail for the Republic of Vietnam. In 1968, the Brule sustained seven rocket hits while on one of her normal runs. Despite extensive damage to the superstructure and electrical cabling, Brule suppressed the enemy fire and proceeded on schedule. Her crew reported; "ship and crew ready to haul cargo or fight and not necessarily in that order."

=== Ships fate ===
Brule was decommissioned on 1 November 1971 at Chinhae, South Korea, and loaned to the South Korean Navy as ROKS Ulsan (AKL-910). She was sold outright on 15 November 1974 and struck from the Naval Register. She has since been decommissioned from South Korean naval service. Her fate is unknown.

== Ship awards ==

Combat Action Ribbon with service star	Navy Unit Commendation	
American Campaign Medal	Asiatic-Pacific Campaign Medal	World War II Victory Medal
Navy Occupation Service Medal	National Defense Service Medal with service star	Vietnam Service Medal with 12 campaign stars
Vietnam Gallantry Cross Unit Citation	Vietnam Civil Actions Unit Citation	Republic of Vietnam Campaign Medal
