= Southeastern Maritime Industrial Region =

Industrial Region in South Korea

Southeastern Maritime Industrial Region 남동임해공업단지
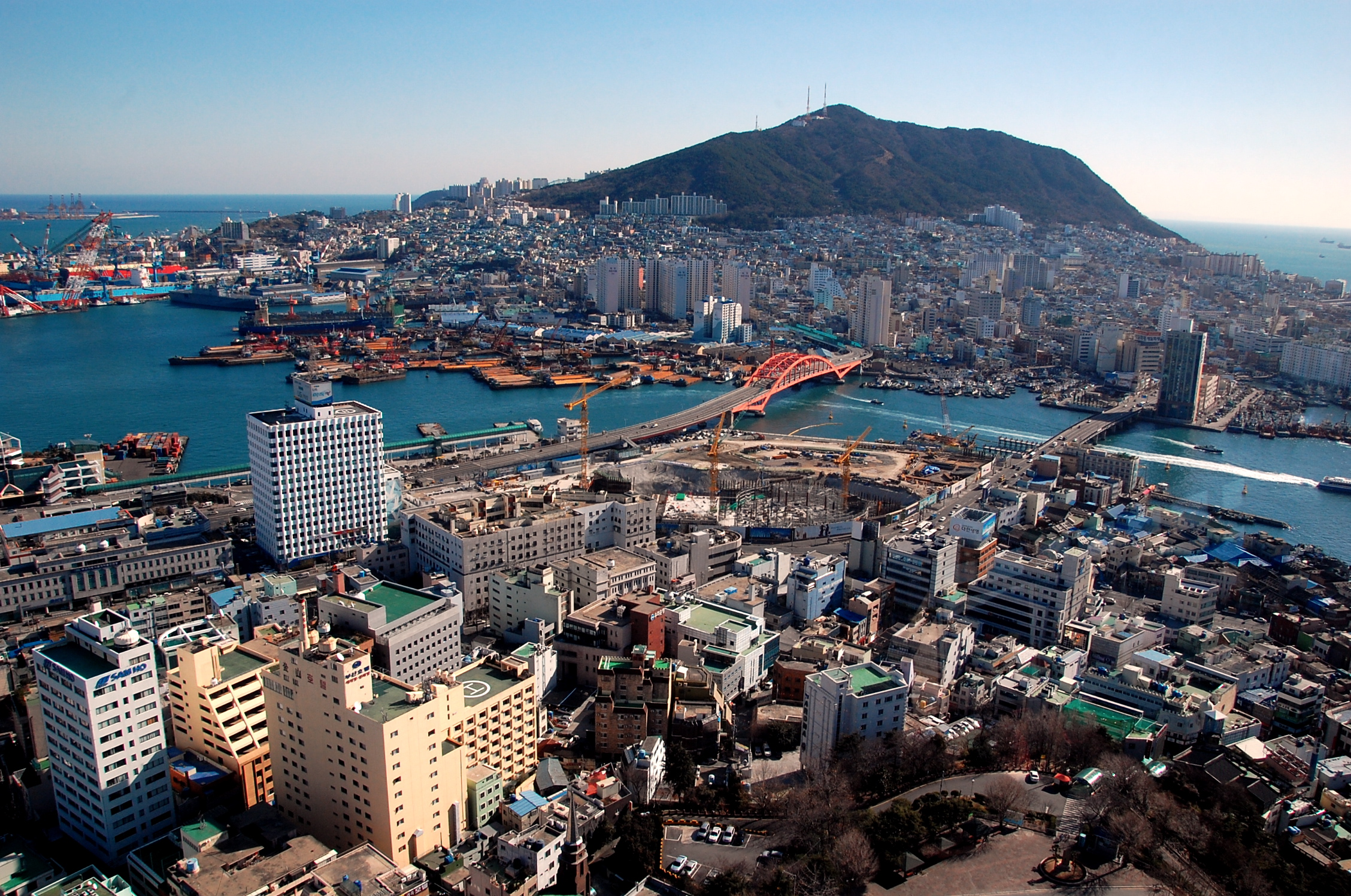

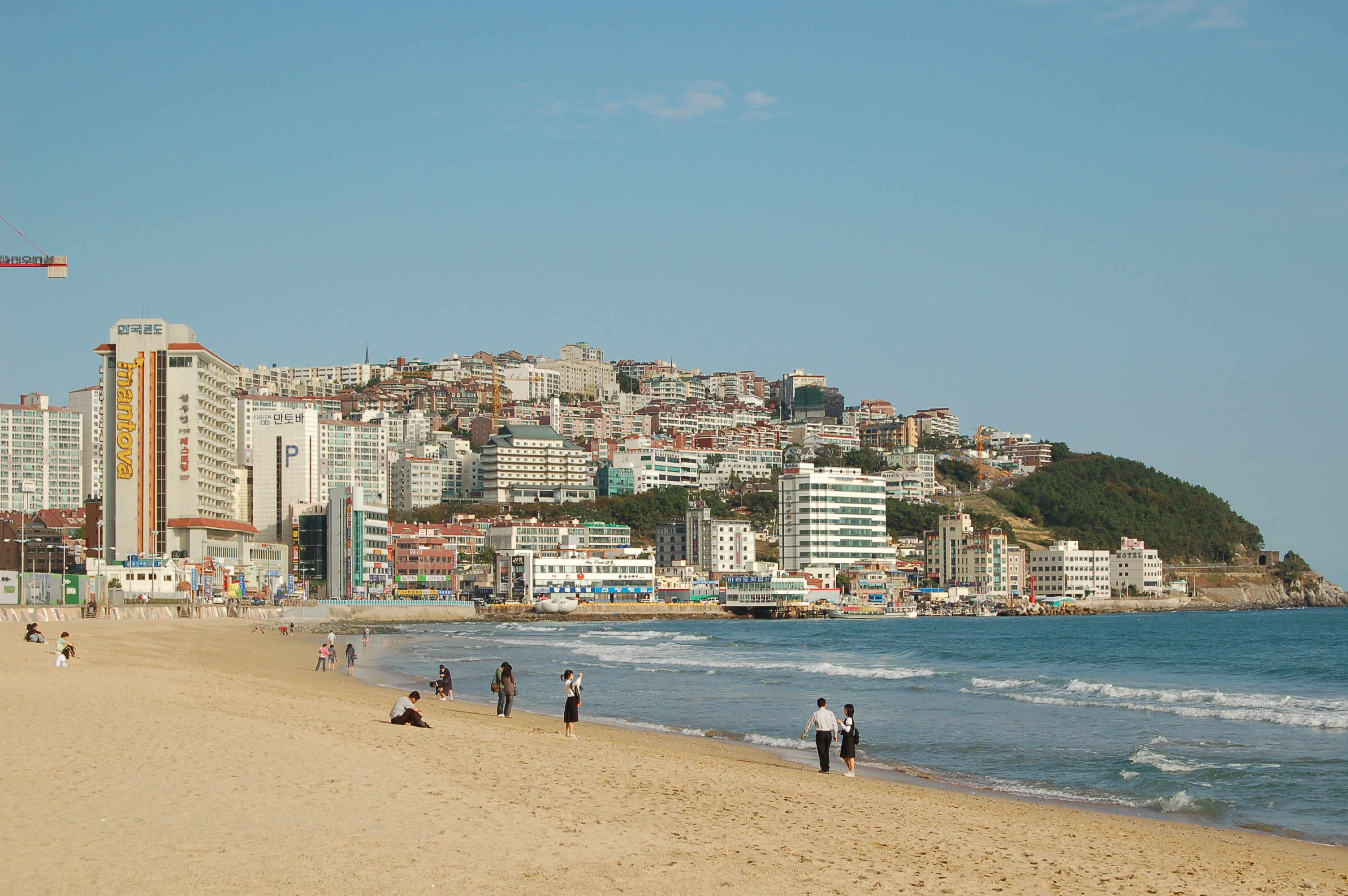

- Country: South Korea
- Major cities: Busan; Ulsan; Changwon; Gimhae; Yangsan; Pohang; Geoje; Gyeongju; Yeosu; Tongyeong; Gwangyang; Suncheon

Population (2016)
  - Metro: 7,752,769
- all major cities combined

The Southeastern Maritime Industrial Region (Korean: 남동임해공업지역), centered on the harbor cities of Busan and Ulsan, is the Republic of Korea's second-largest metropolitan area in terms of population and is the country's second-most developed region as well. It is also an industrial region for shipbuilding, international trade, and heavy industries, such as car making and chemical production.

== Industries ==
The Southeastern Maritime Industrial Region is one of South Korea's chief industrial centers. Only the Capital Metropolitan Area, located around Seoul, is more advanced. This region began to grow as an international centre for commerce and industrial power in the late 1970s, during which the South Korean government began to introduce national development plans to spur South Korean industry. The results were shocking: within a decade, small fishing wharves like Busan and Ulsan grew into densely populated cities with over two million people each. Meanwhile, industries like car manufacturing and shipbuilding, never heard of before in South Korea, progressed ahead with ferocious speed.

Today, the Southeastern Maritime Industrial Region is made up of several industrial cities, all with a special local industry. Ulsan, Geoje, and Busan, all major international ports, especially the latter, which is the world's third-largest trading harbor in terms of total cargo volume, specialize in car manufacturing and shipbuilding. For instance, in 1999, Korean shipbuilding companies based here, such as Hyundai Heavy Industries, Daewoo Shipbuilding and Marine Engineering, and Samsung Heavy Industries overtook Japanese shipbuilding firms as the world's best (). Especially in Ulsan, where heavy industries make up most of the city's revenue, Hyundai Auto and other automobile companies are slowly taking leading positions in the global society.

In other cities, such as Pohang and Changwon, steel and oil refining is particularly advanced. Pohang itself is the seat of POSCO, the Korean steel giant, while Changwon is the capital of South Gyeongsang Province. Finally, in Gimhae and Gyeongju, tourism is very popular, as Gyeongju was the ancient capital of the Silla Kingdom, while Gimhae was the capital of the Gaya Kingdom.

== See also ==
- Geography of South Korea
- Yeongnam
- Economy of South Korea
