= Ulsan-class frigate =

Ship class of the Republic of Korea Navy

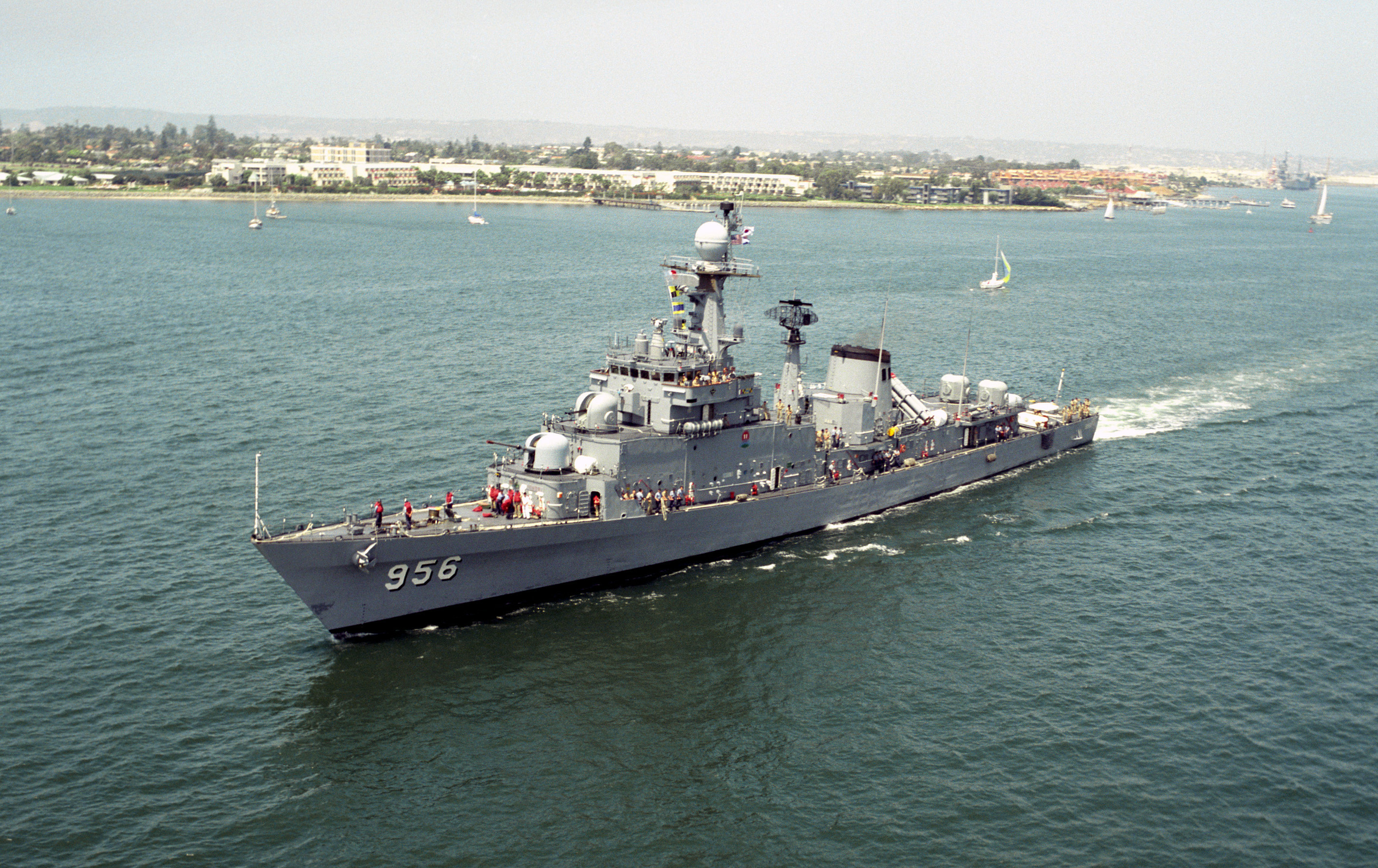
- ROKS Gyeongbuk near San Diego, California

Class overview
- Name: Ulsan class
- Builders: Hyundai Heavy Industries; Korea Shipbuilding Corporation; Korea Tacoma Shipyard; Daewoo Shipyard
- Operators: Republic of Korea Navy; Bangladesh Navy
- Succeeded by: Incheon class
- Completed: 9
- Active: 2
- Retired: 5
- Preserved: 3

General characteristics
- Type: Frigate
- Displacement: 1,500 t (empty); 2,180 t (full, Batch I); 2,215 t (full, Batch II–III)
- Length: 103.7 m (340 ft 3 in)
- Beam: 12.5 m (41 ft 0 in)
- Draught: 3.8 m (12 ft 6 in)
- Propulsion: CODOG; 2 × GE LM2500 gas turbine engine; 2 × MTU 12V 956 TB82 diesel engine
- Speed: 35 knots (65 km/h; 40 mph)
- Range: 8,000 nmi (15,000 km; 9,200 mi) at 16 knots (30 km/h; 18 mph)
- Complement: 186 (16 officers)
- Sensors & processing systems: Fire control system: Signaal SEWACO ZK (Batch I–II); Samsung/Ferranti WSA-423 (Batch III); AN/SPS-10C navigation radar; ST-1802 fire control radar; Signaal PHS-32 hull-mounted sonar; TB-261K towed sonar
- Electronic warfare & decoys: ULQ-11K ESM/ECM suite; 2 × Mark 36 SRBOC 6-tubed chaff/flare launcher; 2 × 15-tube SLQ-261 torpedo acoustic countermeasures
- Armament: Primary gun: 2 × OTO Melara 76 mm/62 cannon; Secondary gun: 4 × Emerson EMERLEC 30 twin Oerlikon 30 mm/75 KCB cannon (Batch I); 3 × Breda DARDO CIWS twin Bofors 40 mm/70 cannon (Batch II–III); Anti-ship: 2 × 4 RGM-84C Harpoon SSM; Anti-submarine: 2 × triple Mark 32 SVTT loaded with; Mark 46 ASW torpedo, or; K745 Blue Shark ASW torpedo (after 2006); 12 × Mk 9 or KMk 9 depth charge

The Ulsan-class frigate (Korean: 울산급 호위함; Hanja: 蔚山級護衛艦) is the high-end complement of the high-low mix domestic naval construction plan of the Republic of Korea Navy under the 1st Yulgok Project (1974–1986) for the Republic of Korea Armed Forces.

== Design ==
The Ulsan class is a light frigate built by Hyundai Heavy Industries and Daewoo Shipbuilding & Marine Engineering. The frigates are 103.7 metres (340 ft 3 in) in length with a top speed of 34 knots (63 km/h; 39 mph) and range of 8,000 nautical miles (15,000 km; 9,200 mi) at 16 knots (30 km/h; 18 mph).

== Ships in class ==
Name	Hull number	Builder	Launched	Delivered	Commissioned	Decommissioned	Operator	Status
Batch I
ROKS Ulsan	FF-951	Hyundai Heavy Industries	8 April 1980	30 December 1980	1 January 1981	30 December 2014	Republic of Korea Navy	Decommissioned. Used as a museum ship in Ulsan.
ROKS Seoul	FF-952	Hyundai Heavy Industries	24 April 1984	15 December 1984	18 December 1984	31 December 2015	Republic of Korea Navy	Decommissioned. Used as a museum ship in Seoul.
ROKS Chungnam	FF-953	Korea Shipbuilding Corporation	14 September 1984	30 June 1985	1 July 1985	27 December 2017	Republic of Korea Navy	Used by the Naval Battle Training Group Eight as reserve & training ship. Offered but refused by the Argentine Navy.
ROKS Masan	FF-955	Korea Tacoma Shipyard	26 October 1984	30 July 1985	7 August 1985	24 December 2019	Republic of Korea Navy	Museum ship on Gangwha Island
Batch II
ROKS Gyeongbuk	FF-956	Daewoo Shipbuilding	23 January 1986		1 August 1986	24 December 2019	Republic of Korea Navy	Used by the Naval Battle Training Group Eight as reserve & training ship.
Batch III
ROKS Jeonnam	FF-957	Hyundai Heavy Industries	19 April 1988		26 October 1989	30 December 2022	Republic of Korea Navy	Decommissioned, held in Reserve as possible training ship or for Foreign Sales/Donation
ROKS Jeju	FF-958	Daewoo Shipbuilding & Marine Engineering	3 May 1988		2 December 1989	30 December 2022	Republic of Korea Navy	Decommissioned, held in Reserve as possible training ship or for Foreign Sales/Donation
ROKS Busan	FF-959	Hyundai Heavy Industries	20 February 1992		2 November 1992		Republic of Korea Navy	Active
ROKS Cheongju	FF-961	Daewoo Shipbuilding & Marine Engineering	20 March 1992		2 December 1992		Republic of Korea Navy	Active

== Foreign variant ==
=== Bangladesh Navy ===
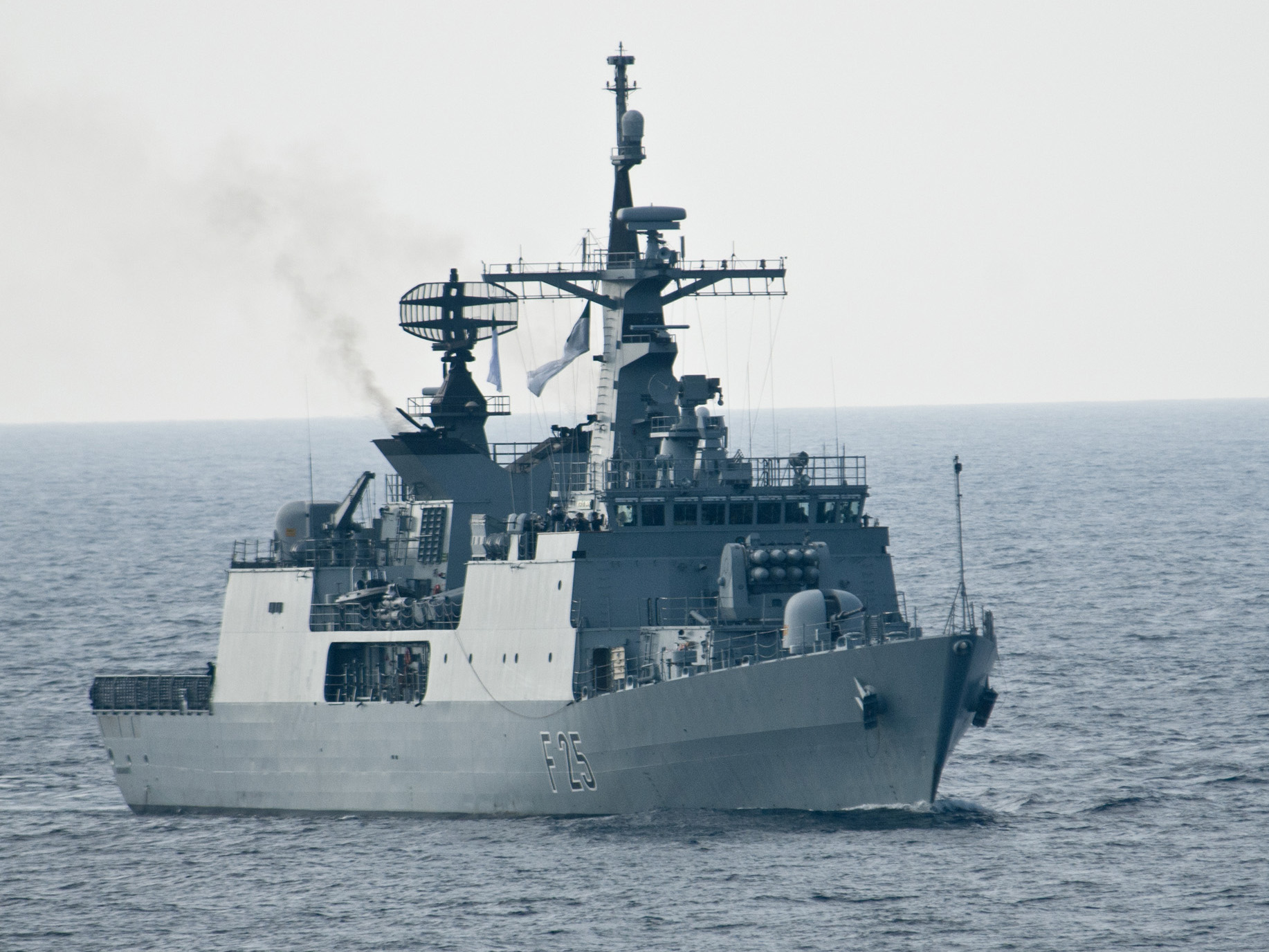
BNS Khalid Bin Walid

In June 2001, the Bangladesh Navy commissioned a frigate based on the Ulsan-class frigate but the design was heavily modified. She is the most modern ship in her fleet.

- BNS Khalid Bin Walid

== See also ==
- List of active Republic of Korea Navy ships
- List of frigate classes by country

Equivalent frigates of the same era

- Almirante Padilla class
- Lupo class
- Koni class
- Type 053
- Wielingen class
- Type 21
