= Thales Nederland =

Dutch defence company

Thales Nederland B.V.

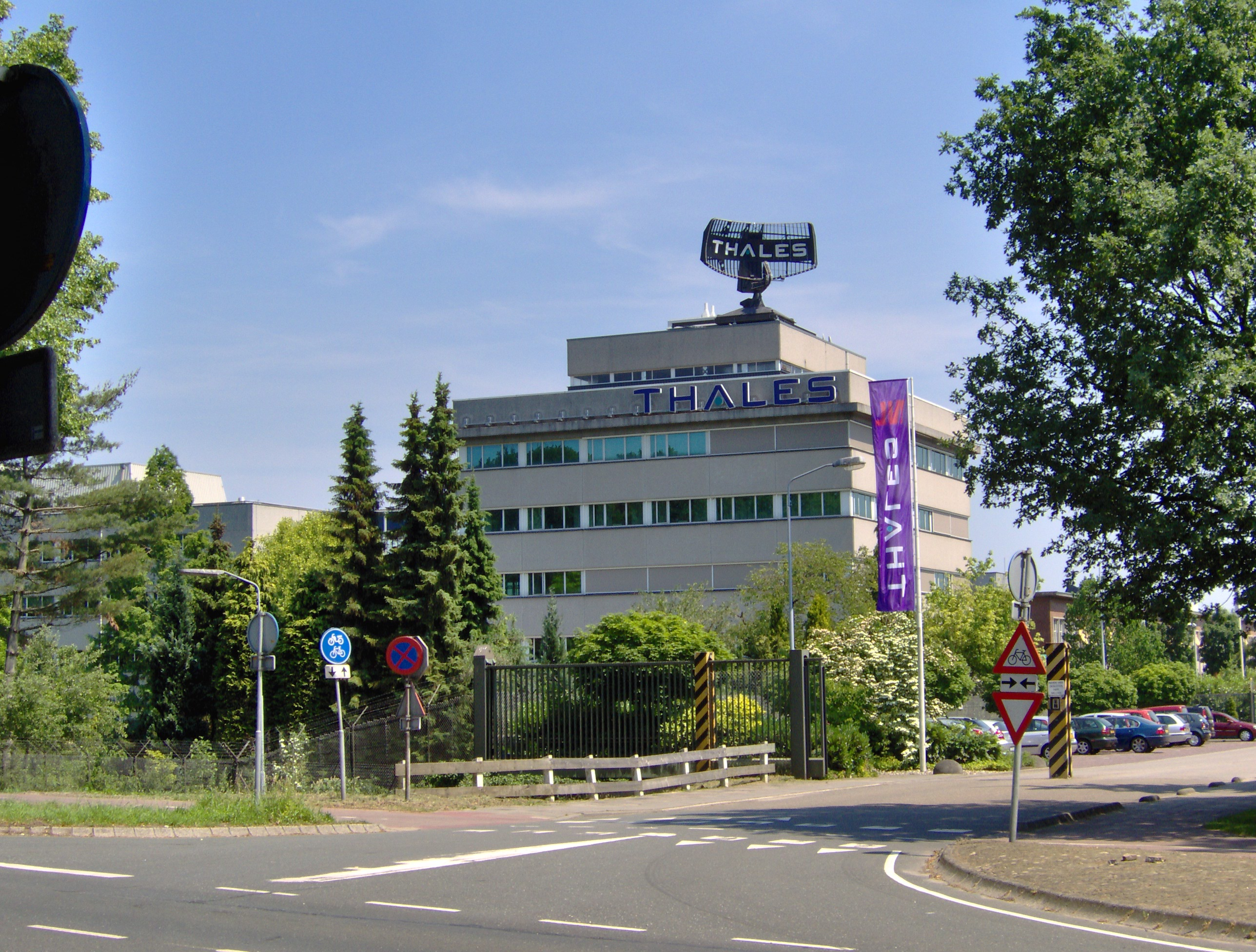
- Thales building in Hengelo (Overijssel), Netherlands
- Type: Subsidiary
- Industry: Defence; Electronics
- Founded: 1922; 104 years ago
- Headquarters: Hengelo, Netherlands
- Area served: Worldwide
- Products: Fire control systems, navigation systems, radars
- Number of employees: 2250 (2022)
- Parent: Thales Group
- Website: www.thalesgroup.com/en/countries/europe/netherlands

Thales Nederland B.V. (formerly Hollandse Signaalapparaten B.V. or in short Signaal) is a subsidiary of the French multinational company Thales Group based in the Netherlands.

The firm was founded as NV Hazemeyer's Fabriek van Signaalapparaten in 1922 by Hazemeyer and Siemens & Halske to produce naval fire-control systems. During the Second World War, the company's factory was captured and pillaged by the German Army; shortly after the conflict's end, the remaining assets were nationalised by the Dutch government, the company being renamed N.V. Hollandsche Signaalapparaten (or Signaal for short). In 1956, the Netherlands-based electronics company Philips became the majority owner of Signaal after buying a large portion of the shares from the government. The firm expanded throughout much of the Cold War period, producing various naval electronics and defense systems for a range of customers around the world.

In 1990, the French electronics and defence contractor Thomson-CSF acquired Signaal from Philips; accordingly, Signaal was rebranded as Thomson-CSF Signaal. Following the renaming of Thomson-CSF to Thales in 2000, Thomson-CSF Signaal was renamed Thales Nederland. Presently, the company is primarily involved in naval defence systems, such as sensors, radars and infrared systems. Other areas of business include air defence, communications, optronics, cryogenic cooling systems and navigation products.

== History ==
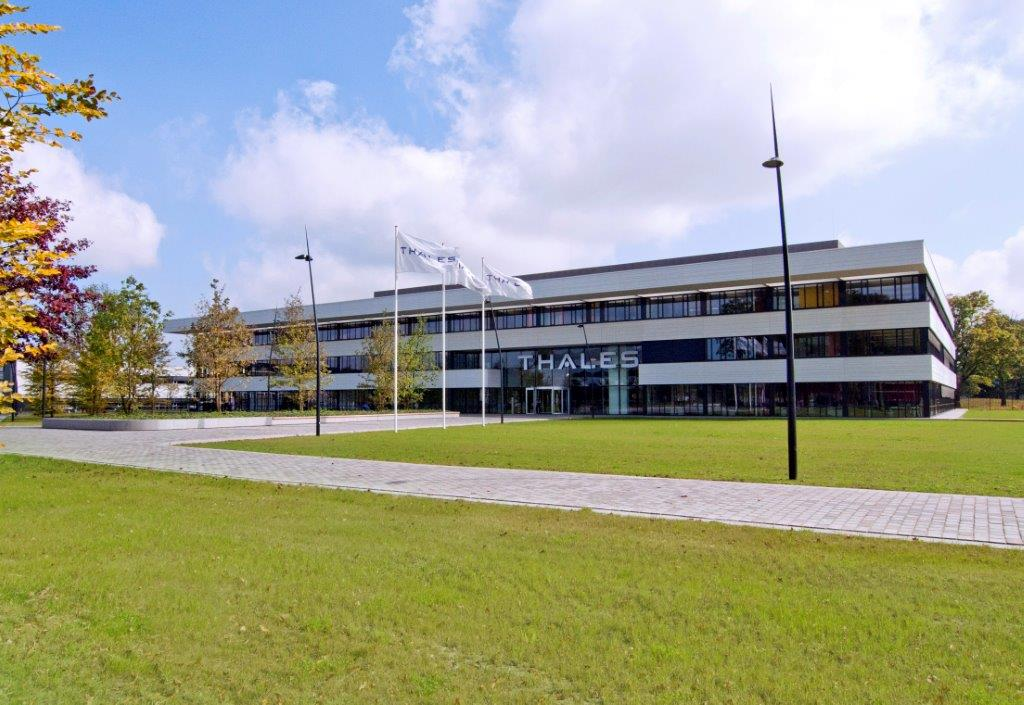
Building of Thales Nederland in Hengelo

The company was founded in 1922 in the city of the Hengelo, in the Netherlands as NV Hazemeyer's Fabriek van Signaalapparaten by Hazemeyer and Siemens & Halske. Initially specialising in the development of naval fire-control systems, the company was established in the Netherlands as a means of getting around the restrictions imposed by the Treaty of Versailles on Germany; there was a specific stipulation forbidding any German company from manufacturing military equipment. The first major contract to be secured by the company was for the production of the fire control systems of the HNLMS Sumatra and HNLMS Java, two of the Royal Netherlands Navy's Java-class light cruisers. Throughout the interwar period, the firm expanded rapidly, gaining customers in overseas nations such as Sweden, Spain and Greece.

In May 1940, amid the turbulent world events of the Second World War, the company's factory was captured virtually intact by the German Army, having invaded the country during the Battle of the Netherlands. A high proportion of the firm's employee were able to escape to the United Kingdom, where many applied their expertise with radar and fire control systems on behalf of the Allies. Following the Liberation of the Netherlands and the end of the conflict, most chose to return to the country; the factory itself having been pillaged and left derelict by the Germans.

In the immediate postwar years, the Dutch government, being aware of the company's value as a part of its wider defence industry, decided to intervene, nationalising the company along with its remaining assets, after which it operated under the name N.V. Hollandsche Signaalapparaten (or Signaal for short). During the late 1940s, replacement buildings and facilities were erected and new staff was recruited. In this period of reestablishment, several valuable technologies and new systems were developed in fields such as radar, fire control systems, computers and air traffic control apparatus.

In 1956, a large portion of shares in the company were purchased from the Dutch government by the Netherlands-based electronics company Philips, making it the majority owner of Signaal. Over the following decades, the business developed various new product lines. In 1975, Signaal began development of what would become the Goalkeeper CIWS, an autonomous short-range defensive weapon system; it would develop and produce the Goalkeeper for over five decades. In the latter part of the 1980s, another defense subsidiary of Philips, named Usfa, was partially merged with Signaal, becoming known as Signaal USFA.

Throughout the latter half of the twentieth century, the firm continued to expand, opening up multiple factories across the Netherlands. By the end of the Cold War, Signaal had expanded to the point where it had customers in 35 countries and in excess of 5,000 employees. However, the Cold War's demise had led to hefty cuts in many nation's defence budgets, which had in turn caused a downturn in customer demand for Signaal, compelling the company to reorganise itself and to reduce its level of staffing.

In 1990, Philips decided that it no longer wanted to pursue defence as a core activity of its portfolio; thus Signaal was sold on to the French electronics and defence contractor Thomson-CSF. Accordingly, Signaal was rebranded as Thomson-CSF Signaal.

Following the acquisition, various new systems, largely focused upon defence equipment and combat management tools, were developed. It has continued to specialise in the production of integrated naval command and control, sensor, and communications systems, along with ground-based air defense systems, telecommunications equipment, and training services to customers across the world. Shortly following the renaming of Thomson-CSF to Thales in 2000, Thomson-CSF Signaal was renamed Thales Nederland. Since then, the company has continued to expand and seek new opportunities for business. In May 2001, aerospace company EADS Germany and Thales Nederland established a joint venture, ET Marinesysteme, based in Wilhelmshaven, Germany, to develop and produce naval combat systems. The company has been involved in various other projects with EADS, which has since been rebranded as the Airbus Group.

In 2014, a statement of intent was signed between Thales Nederland and the Royal Netherlands Navy to intensify cooperation when it comes to maintenance.

In February 2024, it was reported that Thales Nederland had tripled its radar production over the last few years.

In June 2026 it was reported that Thales and the Dutch Ministry of Defence have signed a strategic partnership agreement to expand radar manufacturing and testing capacity.

== Products ==
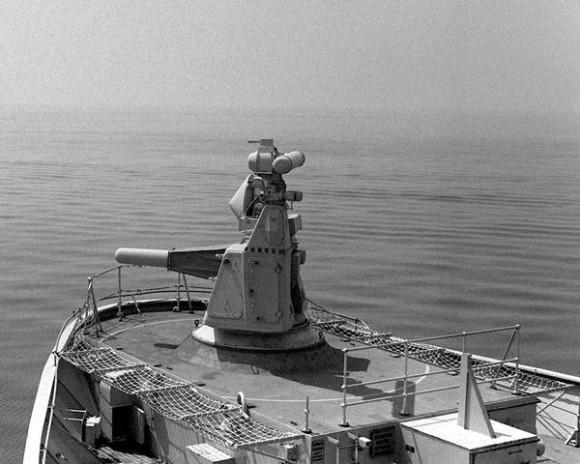
Goalkeeper CIWS on a British Invincible-class aircraft carrier

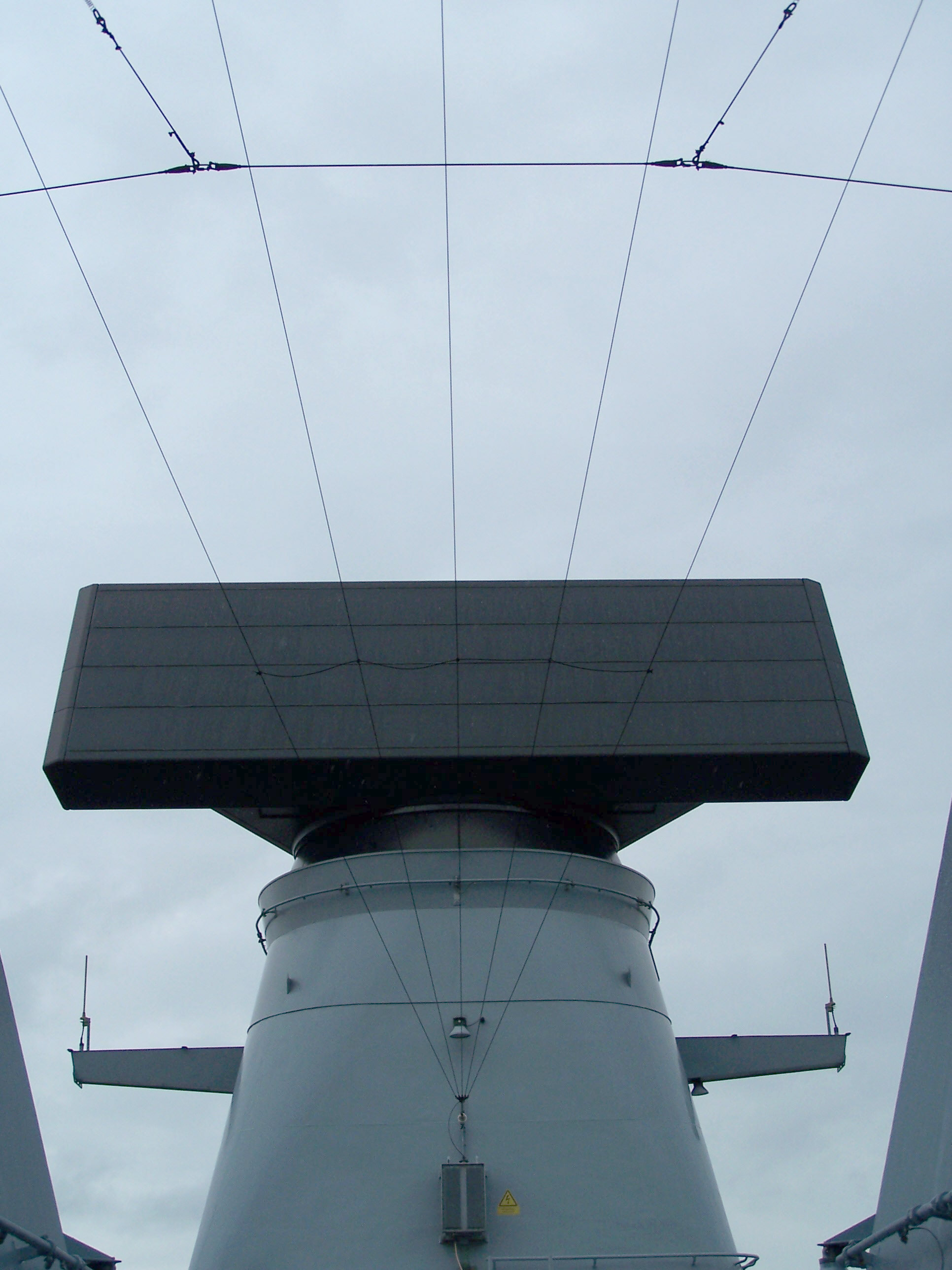
SMART-L onboard F221 Hessen a German Sachsen class frigate

=== Naval systems & sensors ===
- TACTICOS - Combat Management System.
- NS50
- NS100 4D- Naval Air and Surface surveillance 3D AESA radar
- SMART-L-EWC - 3D multibeam radar.
- I-Mast - housing that accommodates all major radars, sensors and antennas of a naval vessel
- Goalkeeper CIWS - autonomous and completely automatic weapon system for short-range defense.
- Gatekeeper - Staring Electro-Optic security system
- Smart-S MK2 multi beam radar

=== Land defence & C4I ===
- Sotas Solutions - vehicle communications
- SQUIRE Ground Surveillance Radar - man-portable medium-range ground surveillance radar

=== Transportation ===
- OV-chipkaart - national chipcard system for public transport in the Netherlands
