= Ganggyeong-class minehunter =

Ship class

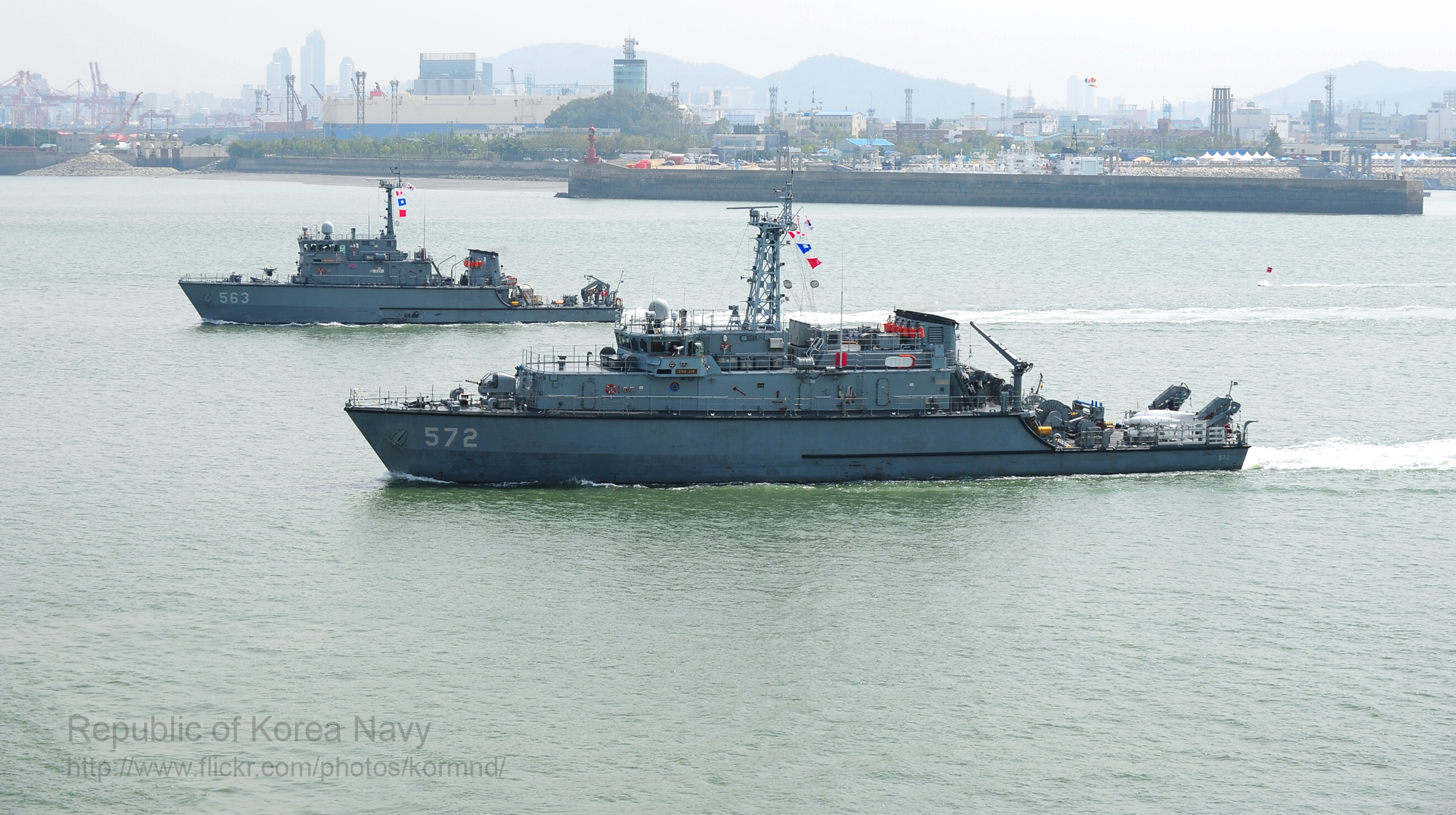
- The ship behind is the Ganggyeong-class minehunter Goryeong

Class overview
- Builders: Kangnam Corporation
- Operators: Republic of Korea Navy
- Built: 1986–1994
- In commission: 1986–present
- Completed: 6
- Active: 6

General characteristics
- Type: Minehunter
- Displacement: 450 tonnes (443 long tons); 512 tonnes (504 long tons) (Full load)
- Length: 50 m (164 ft 1 in)
- Beam: 8 m (26 ft 3 in)
- Draft: 2 m (6 ft 7 in)
- Propulsion: 2 × Voith Schneider Propeller
- Speed: 15 knots (28 km/h; 17 mph)
- Range: 2,000 nmi (3,700 km)
- Sensors & processing systems: Hull-mounted sonar; Side scan sonar
- Electronic warfare & decoys: Mine Disposal Vehicle (MDV)
- Armament: 1 × 20 mm cannon; Small depth charge; 300 mines

Ganggyeong-class minehunter (강경급 기뢰탐색함, 江景級機雷探索艦) is a ship class of minehunters currently in service on the Republic of Korea Navy.

Because of the improvements in naval mine technology in the 1980s, and the lack of minesweeping ability, the Korean Navy designed their first minehunter ship in 1983, developing an unlicensed copy of the Italian Lerici-class. The first ship of the class, Ganggyeong, was launched in 1986. Currently, there are six Ganggyeong-class minehunter operating in the Korean Navy.

== History ==
At the Korean War, Korea did not have proper minesweeping equipment, and it was all about pulling naval mines out of fishing nets or blowing up floating mines with light machine guns. Therefore, North Korea inflicted massive damage by the naval mine. From the 1950s, Korea purchased and used American minehunting vehicles, called Geumhwa, Geumsan, Namyang classes.

In the 1980s, according to the research report on the Navy, the Korean Navy's ability to minesweep was very weak compared to North Korea. There were very few short-range ships, and the ships in operation were seriously degraded due to deterioration. The Korean Navy felt an urgent need to modify existing coastal submarines or to introduce new ships.

The Korean Navy began ship design in 1983, and finished its first minehunter project in 1986, with the launch of the first ship Ganggyeong. Later, five more ships were launched and commissioned.

After the development of Ganggyeong class, the development of the Yangyang-class minesweeper was conducted based on the previous class. The Yangyang class has improved minesweeping ability compared to the Ganggyeong class.

== Design ==
Ganggyeong-class ships are 50 metres (164 ft 1 in) long, 8.31 m (27 ft 3 in) wide. They are equipped with a 20 mm (0.8 in) main gun, small depth charges, about 300 naval mines, and Mine Disposal Vehicle (MDV). They use two Voith Schneider Propellers as propulsion, to control the ship more precisely.

Officially about 50 crew are board the ship, but some source suggests that it is 40.

=== Hull material ===
To protect the ship from magnetic mine, the ship's hull is made of fibre-reinforced plastic, which does not have a magnetic attraction. It also minimized metallic equipment to tightly control the magnetic material inside the ship. Steel objects that are brought into the ship, like canned food, are heavily restricted and strictly controlled.

== Naming ==
The naming of minehunter ships is taken from the names of counties and towns adjacent to a naval base. For example, Ganggyeong is the name of Ganggyeong-Eup in Nonsan, South Chungcheong, and Gangjin is taken from Gangjin County, South Jeolla.

== List of ships ==
Hull no.	Name	Commissioned	Note
MHC 561	ROKS Ganggyeong	1986	First project
MHC 562	ROKS Gangjin	1991	Second project
MHC 563	ROKS Goryeong	1991	Second project
MHC 565	ROKS Gimpo	1993	Third project
MHC 566	ROKS Gochang	1993	Third project
MHC 567	ROKS Gimhwa	1994	Third project

== See also ==
- Wonsan-class minelayer
- Yangyang-class minesweeper
- Nampo-class minelayer
