= Yangyang-class minesweeper =

Ship class

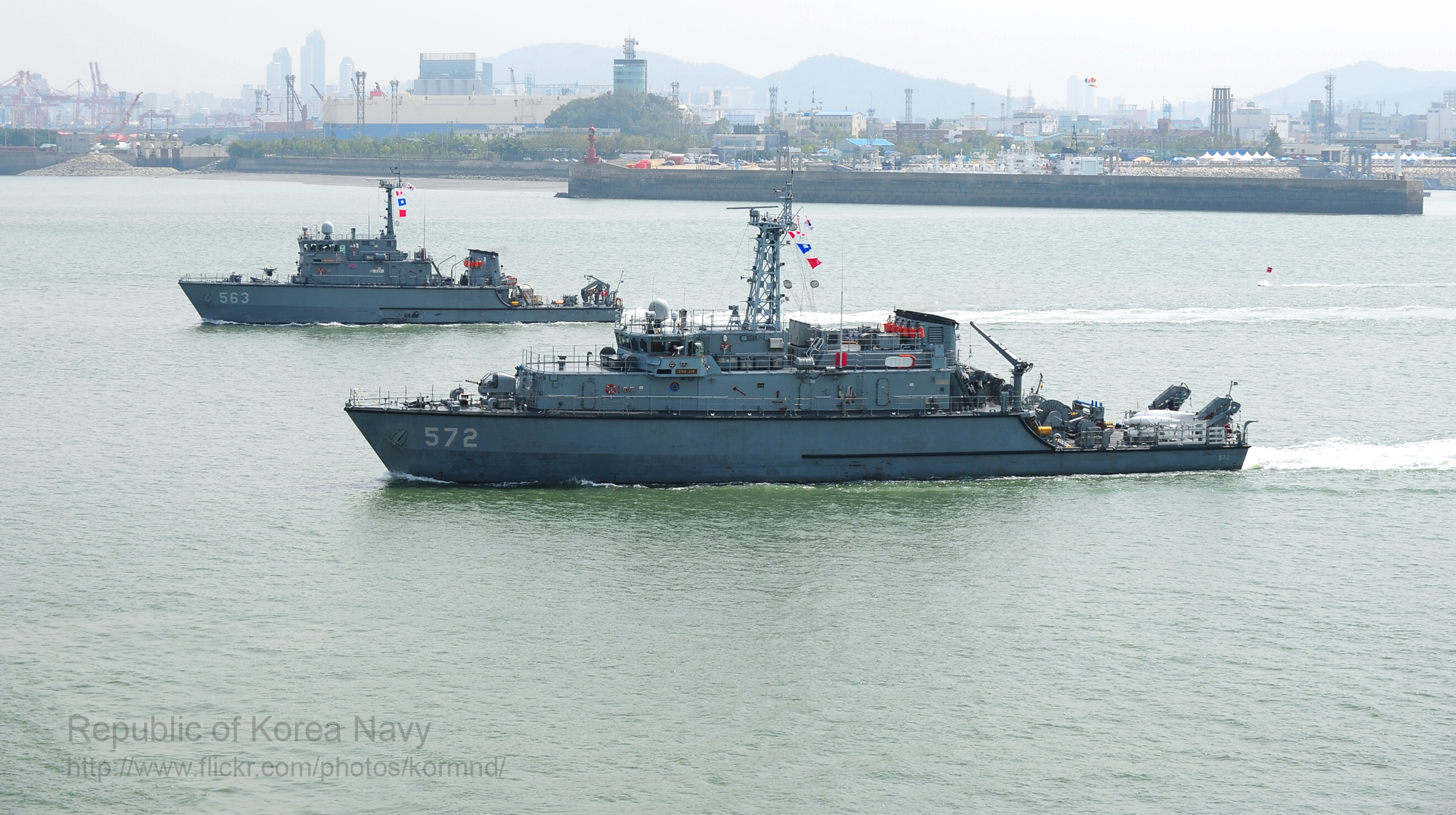
- The ship in front is the Yangyang-class minesweeper Ongjin

Class overview
- Builders: Kangnam Corporation
- Operators: Republic of Korea Navy
- Built: 1999–2021
- In commission: 1999–present
- Completed: 6
- Active: 6

General characteristics
- Type: Minesweeper
- Displacement: 730 tonnes (718 long tons); 880 tonnes (866 long tons) (Full load)
- Length: 60 m (196 ft 10 in)
- Beam: 10.5 m (34 ft 5 in)
- Propulsion: 2 × Voith Schneider Propeller
- Speed: 15 knots (28 km/h; 17 mph)
- Range: 2,970 nmi (5,500 km)
- Complement: about 50–61
- Sensors & processing systems: Side scan sonar; Variable Depth Sonar
- Electronic warfare & decoys: Mine Disposal Vehicle (MDV)
- Armament: 1 × 20 mm cannon; Multi-purpose machine gun

Yangyang-class minesweeper (양양급 소해함, 襄陽級掃海艦) is a ship class of minesweepers currently in service in the Republic of Korea Navy.

Its main missions are gathering data of ports in the Korean region, and searching naval mine and minesweeping, in wartime. They are sometimes used for finding and recovering North Korean missiles, by using Variable Depth Sonar to detect missile fragments.

Ongjin, the second ship of the class, is famous for finding the stern of ROKS Cheonan at the site of the ROKS Cheonan sinking.

== History ==
During the Korean War, Korea did not have proper minesweeping equipment, and it was all about pulling naval mines out of fishing nets or blowing up floating mines with light machine guns. Therefore, North Korea inflicted massive damage by the naval mine. In the 1980s, Korea developed and used 6 Ganggyeong-class minehunters, which were the base of Yangyang-class ships.

In the 1990s, the Navy made an upgraded minehunter design, based on the Ganggyeong-class. The first ship was launched and commissioned in 1999, which was named Yangyang. Two more, Ongjin and Haenam, were launched a few years later. Compared to Ganggyeong-class, Yangyang-class ships improved minesweeping ability, and increased hull size.

== Design ==
Yangyang-class ships are 60 metres (196 ft 10 in) long, 10.5 m (34 ft 5 in) wide. They are equipped with Multi-purpose machine gun, a 20 mm (0.8 in) main gun, and Mine Disposal Vehicle (MDV). They use two Voith Schneider Propellers as propulsion, to control the ship more precisely. To perform minesweeping activities, mechanical/inductive minesweeping device and sonars are equipped.

Officially about 50 crew are boarding the ship.

=== Hull material ===
To protect the ship from magnetic mine, the ship's hull is made of fibre-reinforced plastic, which does not have a magnetic attraction, and lasts longer than commonly used material. It also minimized metallic equipment to tightly control the magnetic material inside the ship. Steel objects that are brought into the ship, like canned food, are heavily restricted and strictly controlled.

== Naming ==
The naming of minesweeper ships is taken from the names of counties and towns adjacent to a naval base. For example, Yangyang is the name of Yangyang County, Gangwon Province.

== List of ships ==
Hull no.	Name	Commissioned
MSH 571	ROKS Yangyang	1999
MSH 572	ROKS Ongjin	2003
MSH 573	ROKS Haenam	2004
MSH 575	ROKS Namhae	2021
MSH 576	ROKS Hongseong	2022
MSH 577	ROKS Goseong	2023

== See also ==
- Ganggyeong-class minehunter
- Wonsan-class minelayer
- Nampo-class minelayer
