= Republic of Korea Navy =

Naval warfare branch of South Korea's military

- 대한민국 해군
- Emblem of the Republic of Korea Navy
- Founded: 11 November 1945 (81 years)
- Country: South Korea
- Type: Navy
- Role: Naval warfare
- Size: 70,000 active duty personnel including 29,000 marines (2022); 262 ships and 88 aircraft
- Part of: Republic of Korea Armed Forces
- Headquarters: Republic of Korea Navy HQ, Gyeryongdae complex, Gyeryong
- Mottos: 바다로, 세계로 ("To the sea, to the world")
- March: Haegunga ("Navy Anthem")
- Engagements: Cold War; Korean War; Vietnam War; Operation Enduring Freedom; Combined Task Force 151 (2009–present)
- Website: navy.mil.kr

Commanders
- President: Lee Jae-Myung
- Minister of National Defense: Kang Shin-chul
- Chief of Naval Operations: Admiral Kang Dong-gil
- Vice Chief of Naval Operations: Admiral

Insignia
- Ensign

- Flag and jack

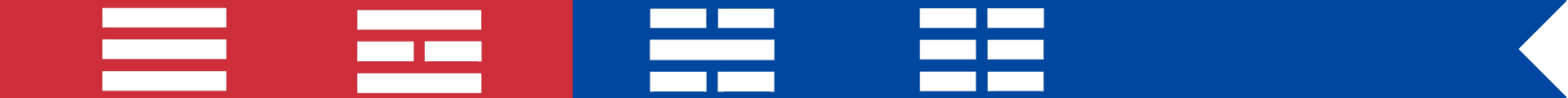
- Pennant

- Roundel

- Symbol

Korean name
- Hangul: 대한민국 해군
- Hanja: 大韓民國海軍
- RR: Daehanminguk haegun
- MR: Taehanmin'guk haegun

The Republic of Korea Navy (ROKN; Korean: 대한민국 해군), also known as the ROK Navy, is the naval warfare service branch of the South Korean armed forces, responsible for naval and amphibious operations. The South Korean navy includes the Republic of Korea Marine Corps, which functions as a branch of the Navy. The ROK Navy has about 80,000 regular personnel including 30,000 Republic of Korea Marines. There are about 262 commissioned ships in the ROK Navy. The naval aviation force consists of about 88 fixed-wing and rotary-wing aircraft. The ROK Marine Corps has about 300 tracked vehicles including assault amphibious vehicles.

The Republic of Korea Navy was established as the Marine Defense Group on November 11, 1945, after Korea was liberated from the Empire of Japan on August 15, 1945. Since the Korean War, the South Korean navy had concentrated its efforts on building naval forces to counteract hostilities of North Korea. As South Korea's economy grew, the ROK Navy was able to locally build larger and better equipped fleets to deter aggression, to protect the sea lines of communication, and to support the nation's foreign policy. As part of its mission, the ROK Navy has engaged in several peacekeeping operations since the turn of the 21st century. The ROK Navy aims to become a blue-water navy in the 2020s.

== Duties and objectives ==
The main duties of the Navy shall be operations on the sea, including landing operations, and the main duties of the Marine Corps shall be landing operations, and the Navy and Marine Corps shall be formed and equipped for that purpose and shall provide education and training necessary therefor.

— Act on the Organization of National Armed Forces

The objectives of the ROK Navy as the main force for the national security and prosperity are:

- To deter war
- To gain victory at sea
- To protect national interests
- To contribute to world peace

== History ==
=== Origins ===
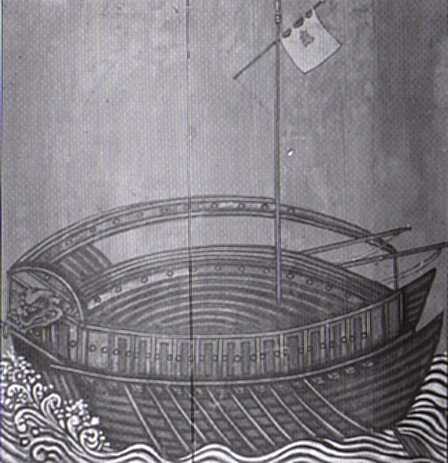
Early 15th century Korean turtle ship in an illustration dating to 1795

Korea has a long history of naval activity. In the late 4th century during the Three Kingdoms period, Goguryeo defeated Baekje, fielding amphibious forces of 40,000 men in the process. In 732, the Balhae navy "attacked the Shandong peninsula and destroyed the biggest seaport of the Tang Empire in the east – Dengzhou." In the 9th century, Commissioner Chang Pogo of Unified Silla established a maritime base called Cheonghaejin on an island to foster trading with China and Japan, and to eradicate pirates.

In 1380, naval forces of the Goryeo dynasty defeated 500 invading Japanese pirate vessels by deploying shipboard guns, devised by Ch'oe Mu-sŏn. This is reportedly the first use of shipboard guns in naval history. In 1389 and 1419, Korean naval forces invaded Tsushima Island to suppress Japanese piracy. In the early years of the Joseon dynasty, the naval force reached its peak of 50,000 personnel, in order to combat the ongoing piracy issue.

During the Japanese invasions of Korea (the Imjin War) in the 16th century, the Korean naval force commanded by Admiral Yi Sun-sin, who later became the head of the navy, cut off the invaders' naval lifeline and defeated the Japanese fleet, reversing the war in favor of Joseon. Admiral Yi is also credited with the creation of the Turtle Ship.

By the end of the 19th century, the Joseon navy had no significant naval force other than coastal defense fortresses. In 1893, the Joseon court requested the British Consul-General to dispatch a naval officer for organizing a naval school in an attempt to modernize the navy. In September 1893, the navy school was established in Ganghwa Island. Lieutenant William H. Callwell, a retired British naval officer, and John W. Curtis, a gunnery instructor, served as instructors for 160 cadets and sailor recruits. However, the Royal Naval Academy was closed in November 1894, and the Joseon navy was brought to an end in 1895 due to the First Sino-Japanese War and the Gabo Reform. In 1903, the government of the Korean Empire purchased its first modern naval ship, KIS Yangmu. Korean naval tradition was disrupted after Korea was annexed by the Empire of Japan in 1910. During the Japanese occupation of Korea, the Imperial Japanese Navy (IJN) built a considerable naval base – Chinkai Guard District in southern Korea (at present-day Jinhae).

=== Founding years and Korean War ===
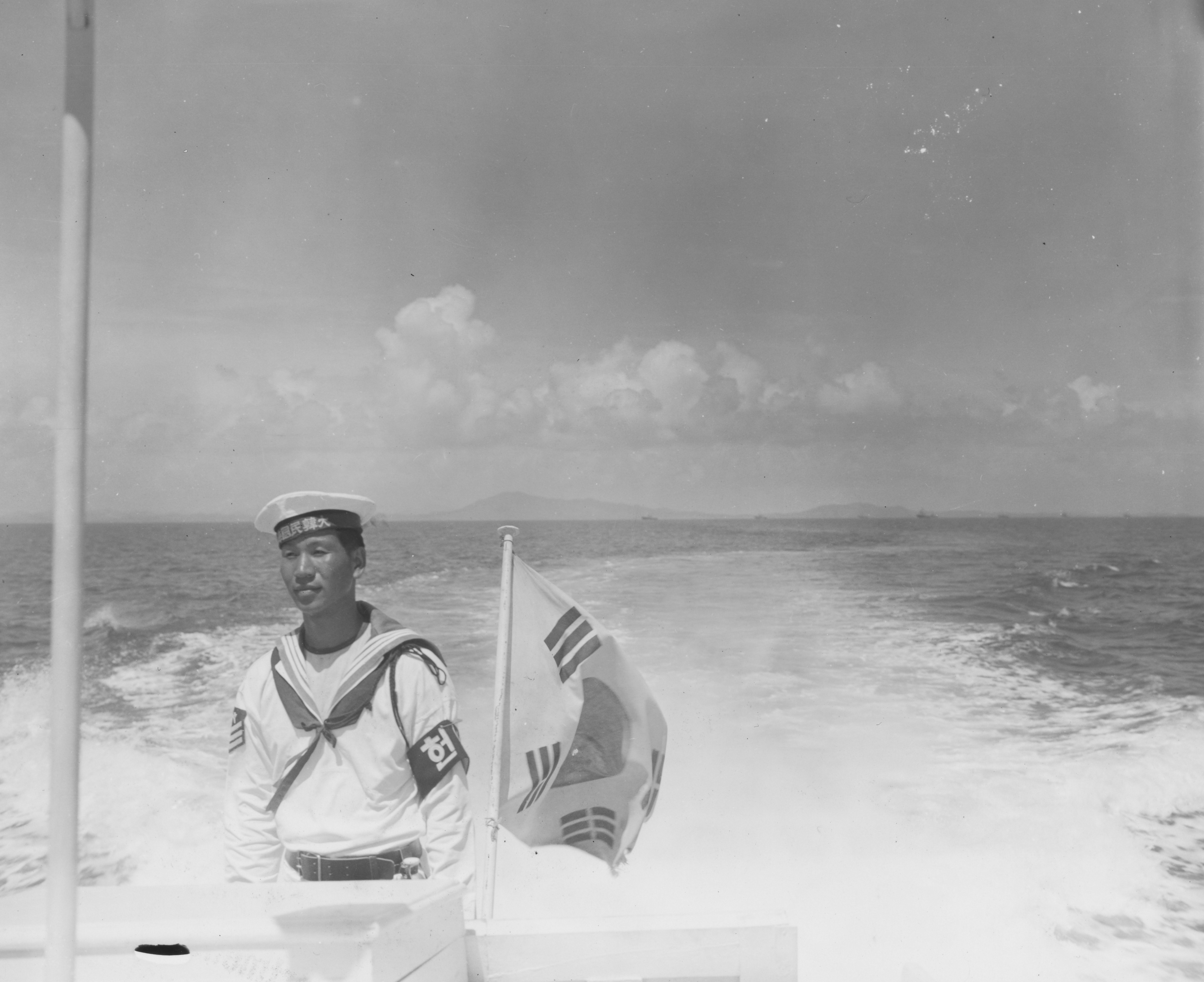
ROKN sailor on Inchon harbor in 1949

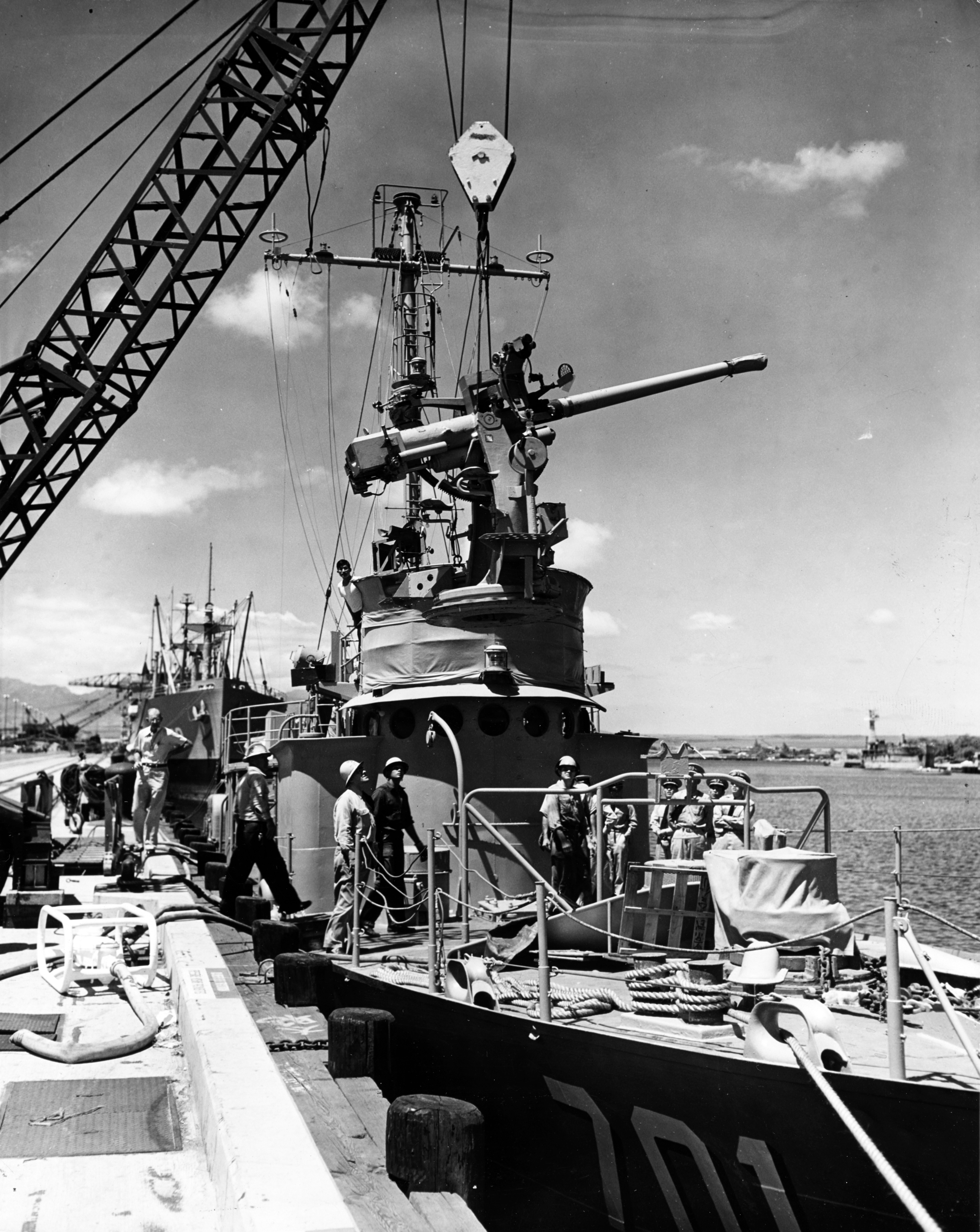
ROKS Baekdusan (PC 701), the first warship of the ROK Navy, undergoing refitting at Hawaii in March 1950

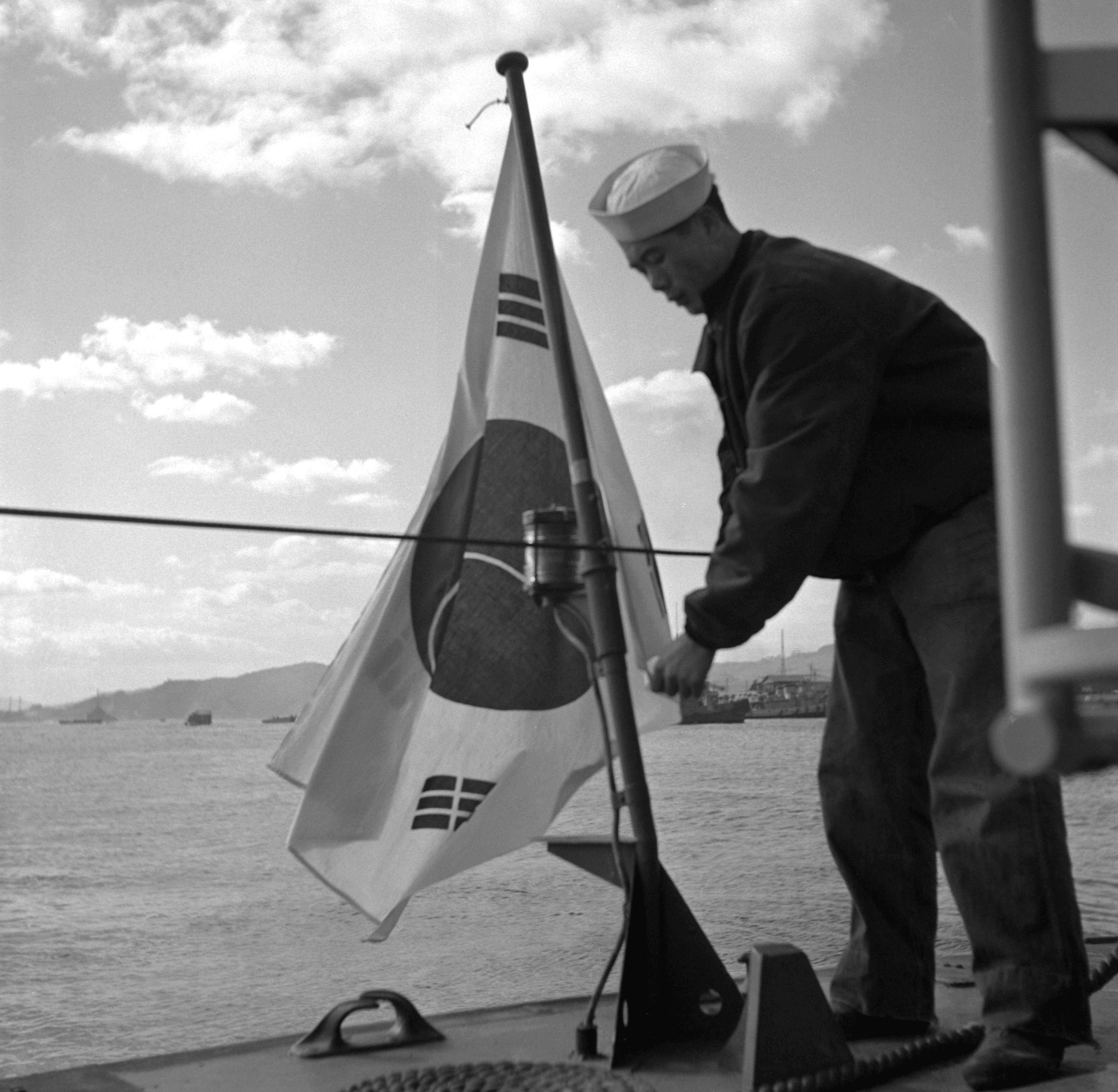
A ROKN sailor places a S. Korean naval ensign on a torpedo boat, after its transfer by the U.S. in the midst of the Korean War.

The Republic of Korea Navy was established as the Marine Defense Group on November 11, 1945. After Korea was liberated from the Empire of Japan on August 15, 1945, Sohn Won-yil, a former merchant mariner and son of the Methodist minister and independence activist Sohn Jung-do, organized the Marine Defense Group in Seoul. The Group formed the Korean Coast Guard and Coast Guard Academy at Jinhae, and the Korean Coast Guard acquired 36 patrol boats (mainly ex-IJN and USN minecraft) through the United States Army Military Government in Korea. After the South Korean government was established on August 15, 1948, the Korean Coast Guard became the Republic of Korea Navy, and Sohn was appointed as the first Chief of Naval Operations of the ROK Navy. On April 15, 1949, the Republic of Korea Marine Corps (ROKMC) was founded at Jinhae.

In October 1949, the ROK Navy purchased a 600-ton submarine chaser, the former USS PC-823 with funds raised among its personnel. She was renamed ROKS Baekdusan (PC 701) after Paektu Mountain, and became "the first significant warship of the newly independent nation".

The Korean War started with the North Korean army's surprise attack on Sunday, June 25, 1950. The ROK Navy confronted threats from the North Korean navy: "Perhaps the most aggressive and effective, if smallest, member of the South Korean armed services during the first year of the Korean War was the Republic of Korea Navy (ROKN). At the outset of the conflict, the 6,956-man ROKN, with [33] naval vessels of various types, was outnumbered by the 13,700 men and 110 naval vessels of the North Korean navy." With its UN allies, dominated by U.S. forces, the ROK Navy was able to gain control in the seas surrounding the country, as a task group of the UN Blockading and Escort Force (Task Force 95). On July 27, 1953, the three-year-long war was brought to an end when an armistice agreement was signed. During the war, Australia, Canada, Colombia, Philippines, France, the Netherlands, New Zealand, Thailand, the United Kingdom, and the United States contributed naval vessels as UN allies; Denmark sent the hospital ship Jutlandia. During the Korean War, the ROK Navy acquired 28 ex-USN ships including five Tacoma-class frigates.

In September 1953, the ROK Navy established the Republic of Korea Fleet, which was responsible for the operation and training of the ships.

=== Building up the fleet ===
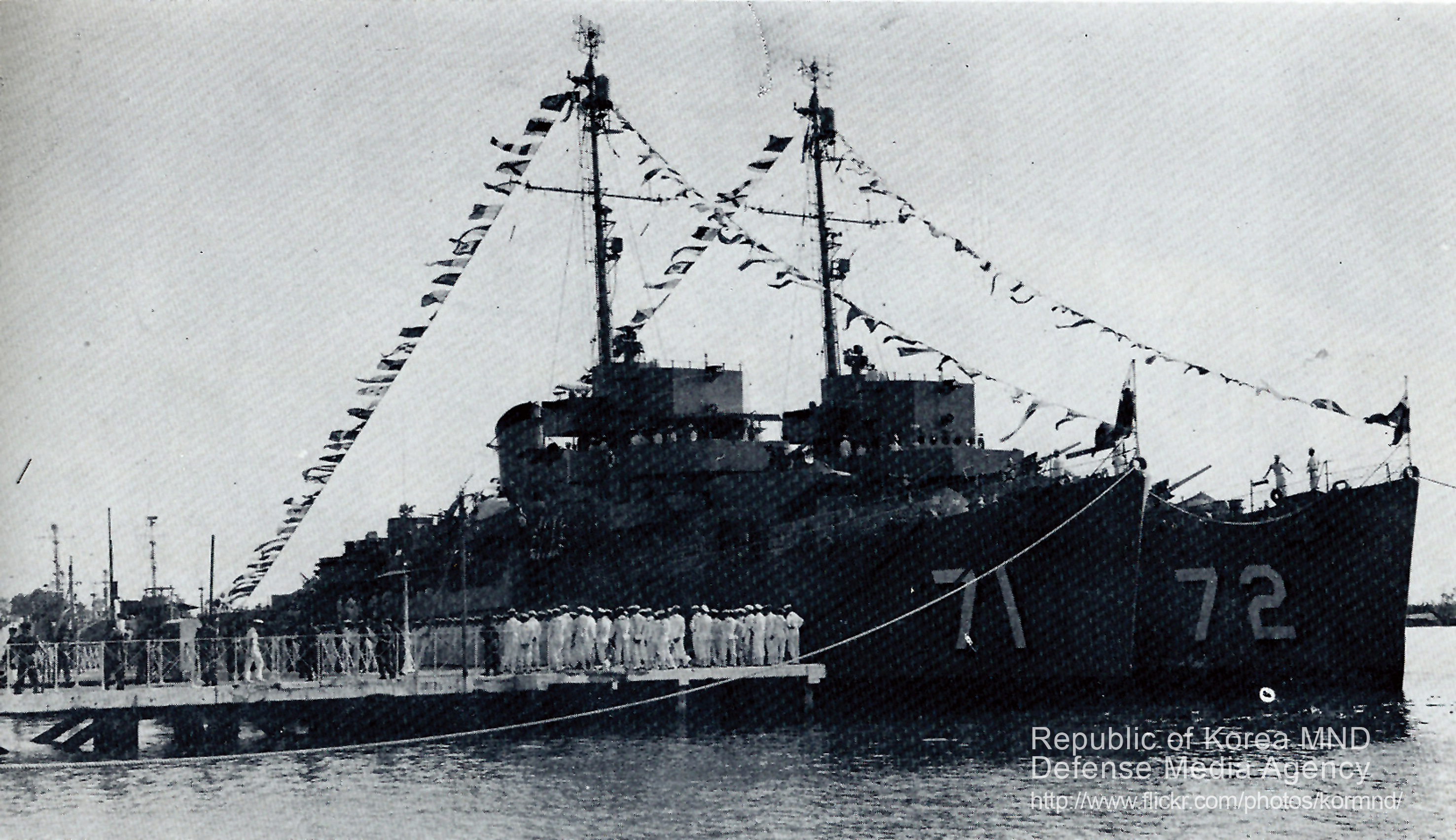
Ex-USN Cannon-class destroyer escorts transferred to the ROK Navy at Boston in 1956

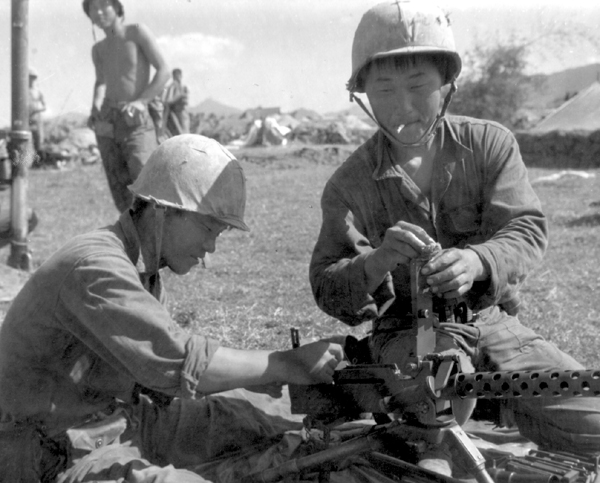
ROK Marines prepare defensive positions near Tuy Hòa, in S. Vietnam, c. 1965.

After the Korean War, the ROK Navy built up its surface fleet with World War II-era warships loaned from the U.S. Navy. From 1955 to 1960, the ROK Navy acquired 42 ex-USN warships including two Cannon-class destroyer escorts. In May 1963, the ROK Navy acquired its first destroyer, ROKS Chungmu (DD 91), a Fletcher-class destroyer. Starting from 1972, nine former USN Allen M. Sumner-class and Gearing-class destroyers were transferred and added to the ROK Fleet inventory.

During the Vietnam War, the ROK Navy dispatched the Naval Transport Group ("Seagull"), and the Republic of Korea Marine Corps sent the 2nd Marine Brigade ("Blue Dragon") to South Vietnam. In April 1975, just before the Fall of Saigon, two ROKN LSTs evacuated about 1,300 South Vietnamese and South Koreans from South Vietnam to South Korea.

On July 30, 1960, ROKS Gangwon (DE 72), formerly USS Sutton (DE-771), sank the North Korean navy patrol craft PBS 371 off the coast of Geojin. On January 19, 1967, ROKS Dangpo (PCE 56), the former USS Marfa, was sunk by North Korean coastal artillery north of the demarcation line off the east coast of Korea. In June 1970, a Navy broadcast vessel (I 2) was captured and abducted by North Korean patrol craft in the vicinity of Yeonpyeong Islands in the West Sea (Yellow Sea).

On February 22, 1974, a Navy harbor tug (YTL 30) capsized off Tongyeong, resulting in death of 153 Navy, Coast Guard recruits and 6 sailors.

=== Indigenous warship building ===
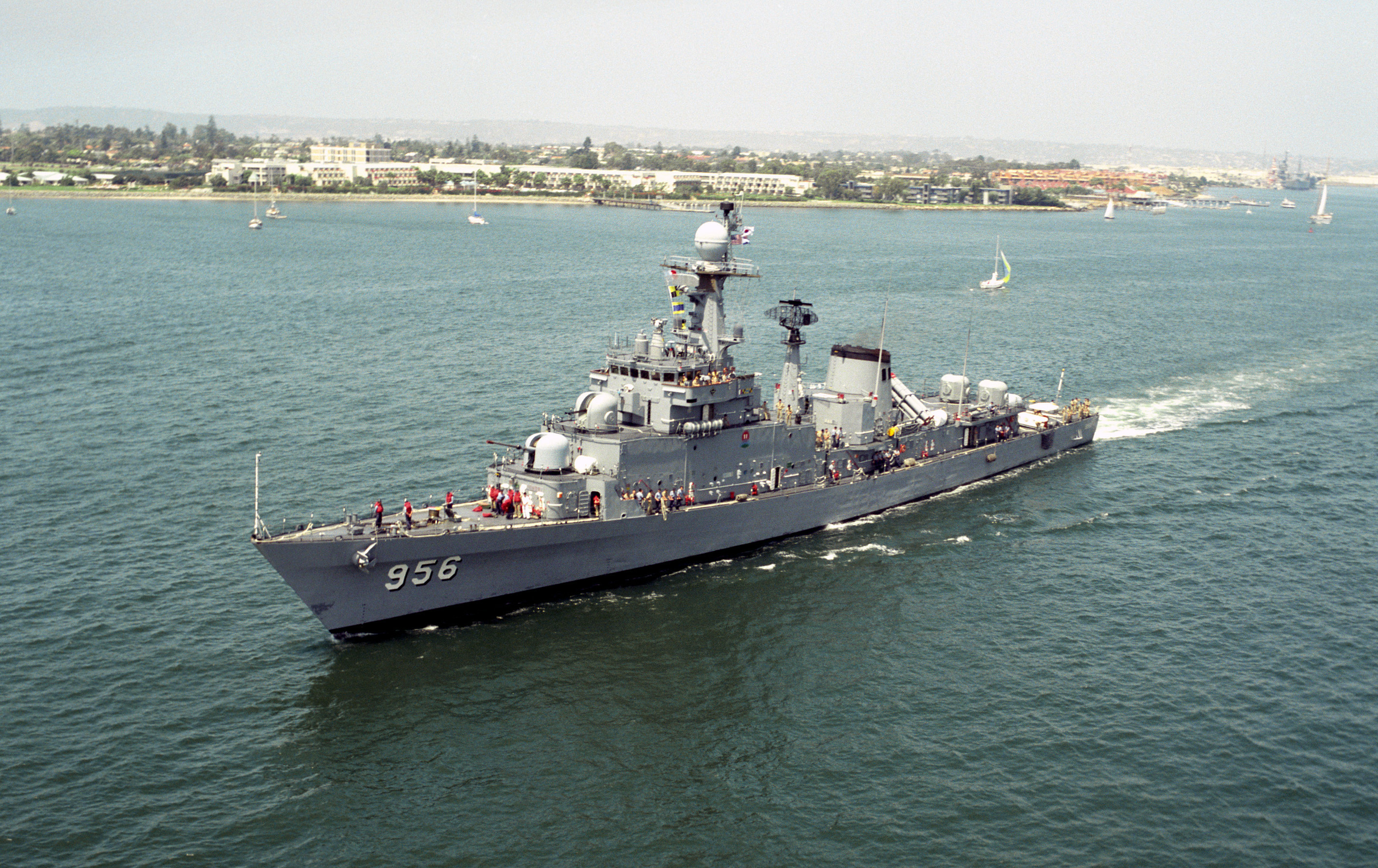
ROKS Gyeongbuk (FF 956), one of the Navy's first locally built Ulsan-class frigates

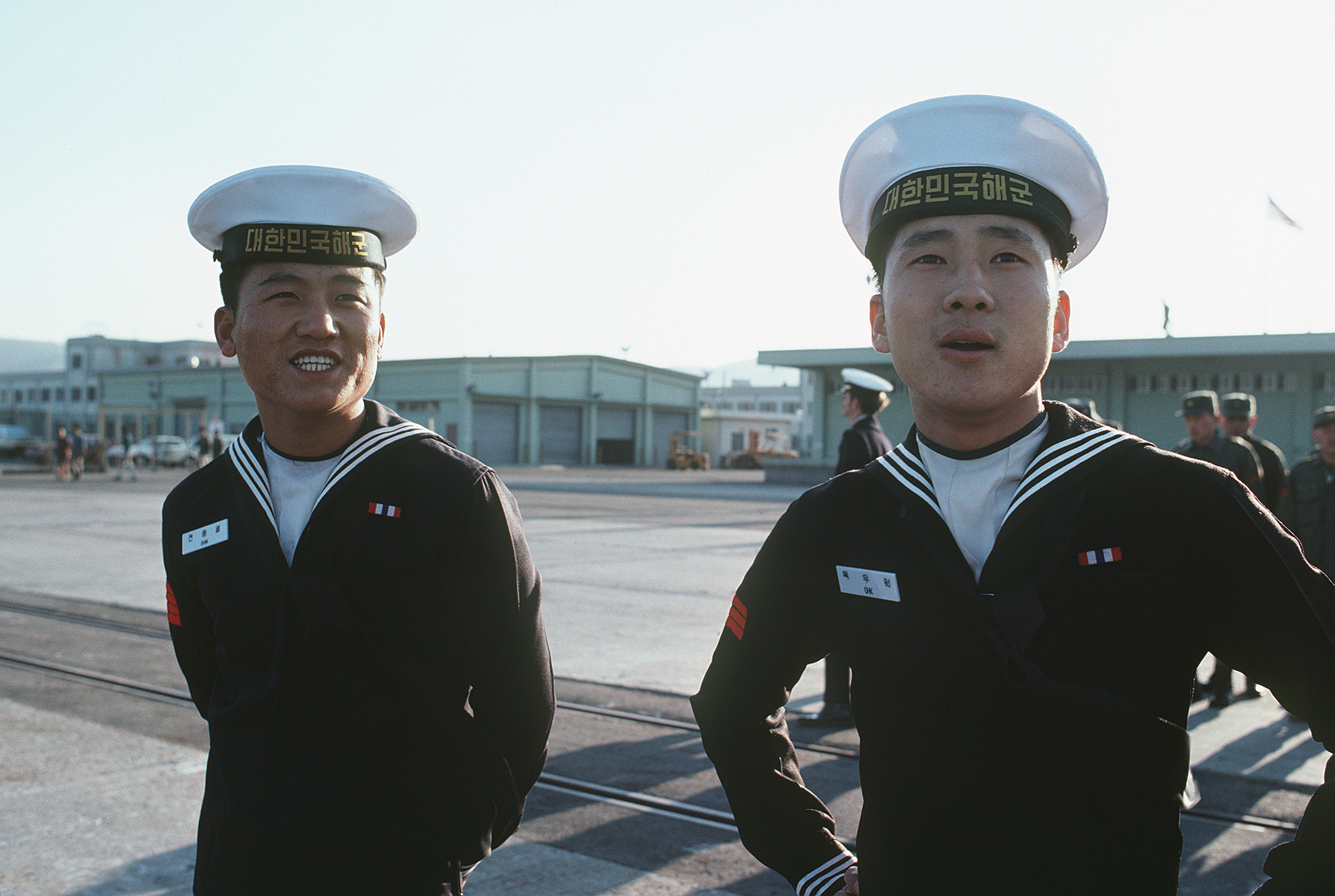
ROKN seamen in the early 1980s; the lettering on their hats reads "Republic of Korea Navy" in Korean.

In the 1970s, through the Park Chung Hee Administration's "Yulgok Operation", a secret effort to strengthen domestic arms production, the ROK Navy began to establish a fleet of locally built warships. The Navy acquired shipbuilding capabilities by planning and building high-speed patrol craft such as Baekgu class and Chamsuri class in the 1970s – in November 1972, the ROK Navy launched its first domestically built fast patrol craft to intercept North Korean spy boats. The lead ship (FF 951) of the 2,000-ton Ulsan-class frigates was launched in 1980. The lead ship (PCC 751) of the 1,000-ton Donghae-class corvettes and the lead ship (PCC 756) of the updated Pohang-class corvettes were launched in 1982 and 1984 respectively. With local shipbuilders, the ROK Navy continued to carry out other shipbuilding programs for such as the Dolgorae-class midget submarine, Kojunbong-class tank landing ship, mine warfare ship (Wonsan-class minelayer, Kanggyung-class minesweeper), Cheonji-class logistics support ship, and Cheonghaejin-class submarine rescue ship in the 1980s and 1990s.

In November 1987, the Headquarters Republic of Korea Marine Corps was re-established; it was disbanded in October 1973 due to budget constraint. In June 1993, the ROK Navy Headquarters was relocated from Seoul to the Gyeryongdae complex, the tri-service headquarters in Gyeryong.

=== From a coastal navy to a green-water navy ===
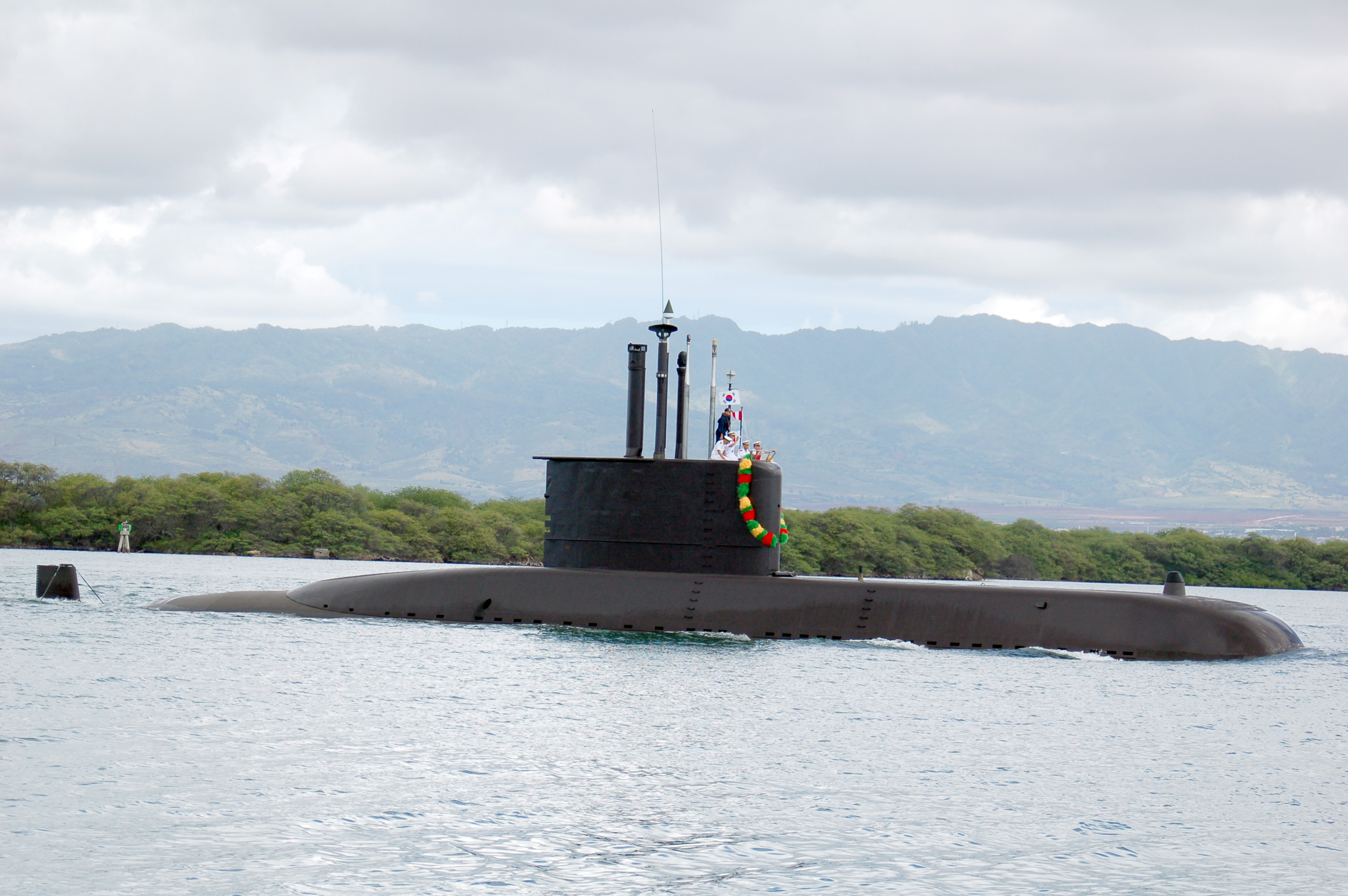
ROKS Lee Sunsin (SS 068), one of the Navy's first locally built Chang Bogo-class submarines

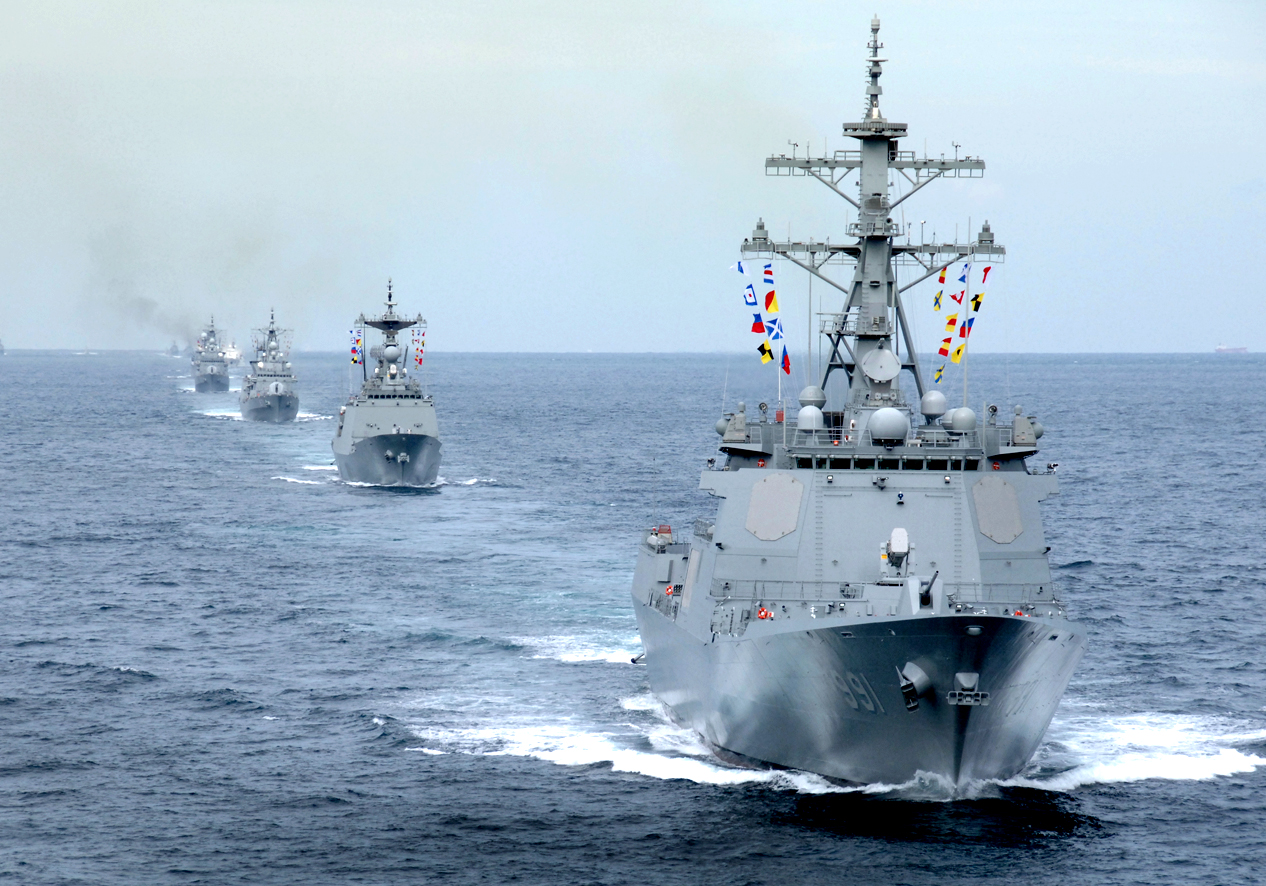
The Navy's first locally built AEGIS destroyer, ROKS Sejong the Great (DDG 991), in formation

Since the 1990s, the ROK Navy has been trying to build an ocean-going fleet to protect its sea lines of communication. In 1989, the Navy mentioned the "Strategic Task Fleet" (Jeollyak-gidong-hamdae) in the Joint Strategic Objectives Plan. The ROK Naval forces began to participate in RIMPAC exercises from 1990. During Admiral An Pyong-tae's tenure as CNO, President Kim Young-sam supported the Navy by approving a long-term shipbuilding plan for the ocean-going navy. In 1999, the Navy developed its strategic vision for the 2020s as "Navy Vision 2020" that outlined the Navy's future Task Fleet, which includes light aircraft carriers and ballistic missile submarines.

At the same time, the ROK Navy steadily upgraded its naval forces: In order to strengthen the surface combatants, the ROK Navy launched the lead ship (DDH 971) of the Kwanggaeto the Great-class destroyer in 1996 to replace the former USN destroyers. For building up a submarine force, the ROK Navy acquired its first submarine (other than midget submarines), ROKS Chang Bogo (SS 061), from Howaldtswerke-Deutsche Werft of Germany in 1992. In order to replace its antiquated S-2 Tracker anti-submarine warfare aircraft, the ROK Navy purchased a squadron of P-3C Orion maritime patrol aircraft, which were delivered starting in 1995.

In October 1998, the ROK Navy hosted its first international fleet review in commemoration of the 50th anniversary of the Republic of Korea and its armed forces off of the coast of Busan and Jinhae.

In June 1999, the ROK and DPRK naval forces met in the First Battle of Yeonpyeong near the Northern Limit Line (NLL) in the vicinity of Yeonpyeong Islands. On June 29, 2002, the two navies engaged again in the same vicinity, resulting in the sinking of ROKS Chamsuri 357 (PKM 357).

In 2002, the lead ship (DDH 975) of the 4,800-ton Chungmugong Yi Sunshin-class destroyers was launched. In 2005, an 18,800-ton amphibious transport dock, ROKS Dokdo (LPH 6111) was launched. In 2006, the ROK Navy launched the lead ship (SS 072), which was named after the first Chief of Naval Operations, of the 1,800-ton Sohn Wonyil-class submarine equipped with an Air-Independent Propulsion (AIP) system. In May 2007, the ROK Navy launched the lead ship (DDG 991) of the 11,000-ton Sejong the Great-class destroyers, built around the American-made AEGIS combat system and the SPY-1D(v) multi-function phased array radar. In December 2008, the ROK Navy commissioned the fast missile craft ROKS Yoon Youngha (PKG 711), which was named after the skipper of ROKS Chamsuri 357.

From 2001 to 2003, a naval transport unit called Haeseong supported Operation Enduring Freedom and the Sangnoksu Unit in East Timor. In 2005, the Navy dispatched transport unit Jejung to supply aid in humanitarian response to the 2004 Indian Ocean earthquake. The ROK Navy hosted its second international fleet review off coast of Busan in October 2008 to celebrate the 60th anniversary of the South Korean government.

On March 26, 2010, ROKS Cheonan (PCC 772), a Pohang-class corvette was sunk by a North Korean torpedo, resulting in the deaths of 46 sailors near Baengnyeong Island, in the vicinity of the Northern Limit Line.

=== From green water to blue water ===
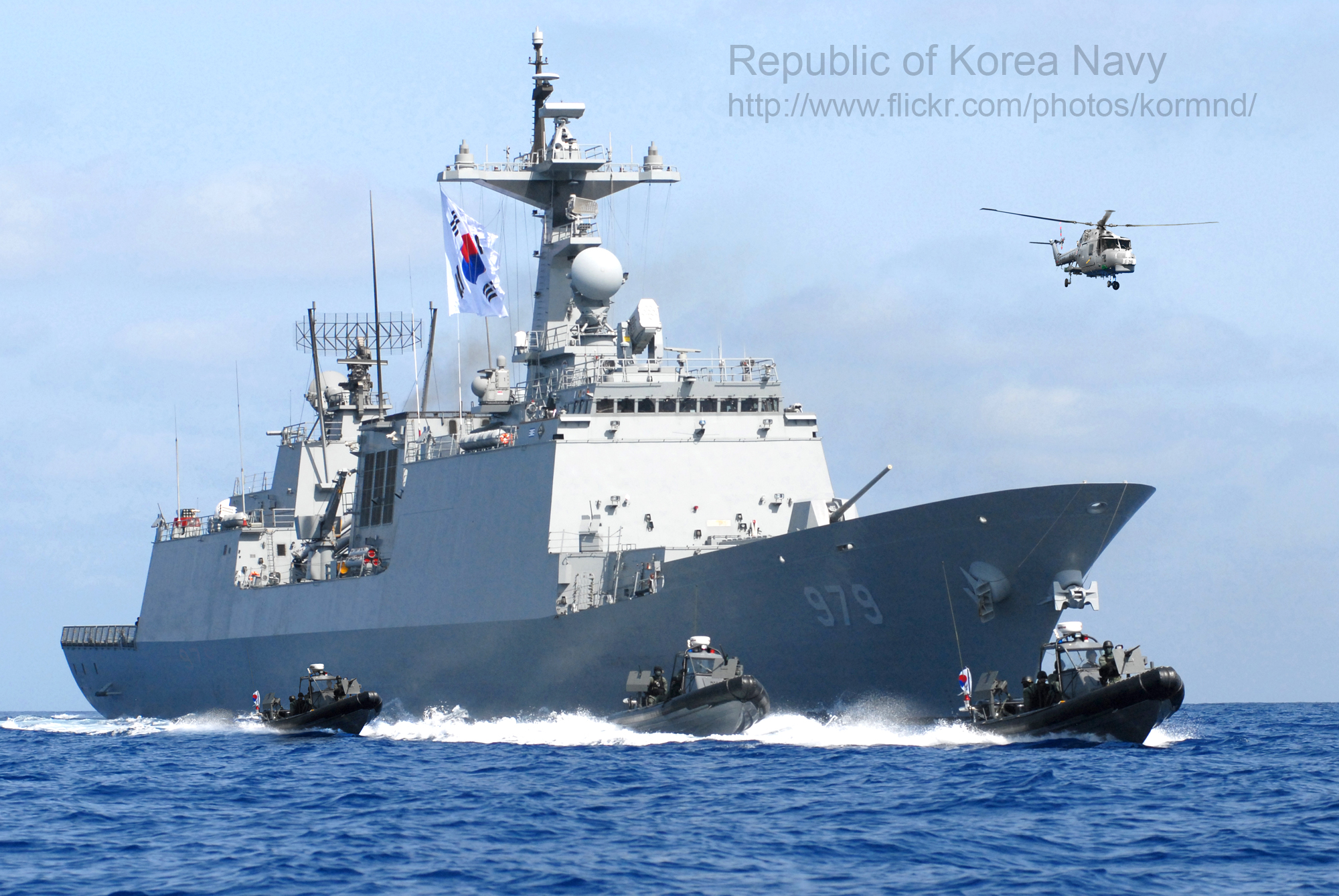
The Cheonghae unit of the multinational naval task force, Combined Task Force 151

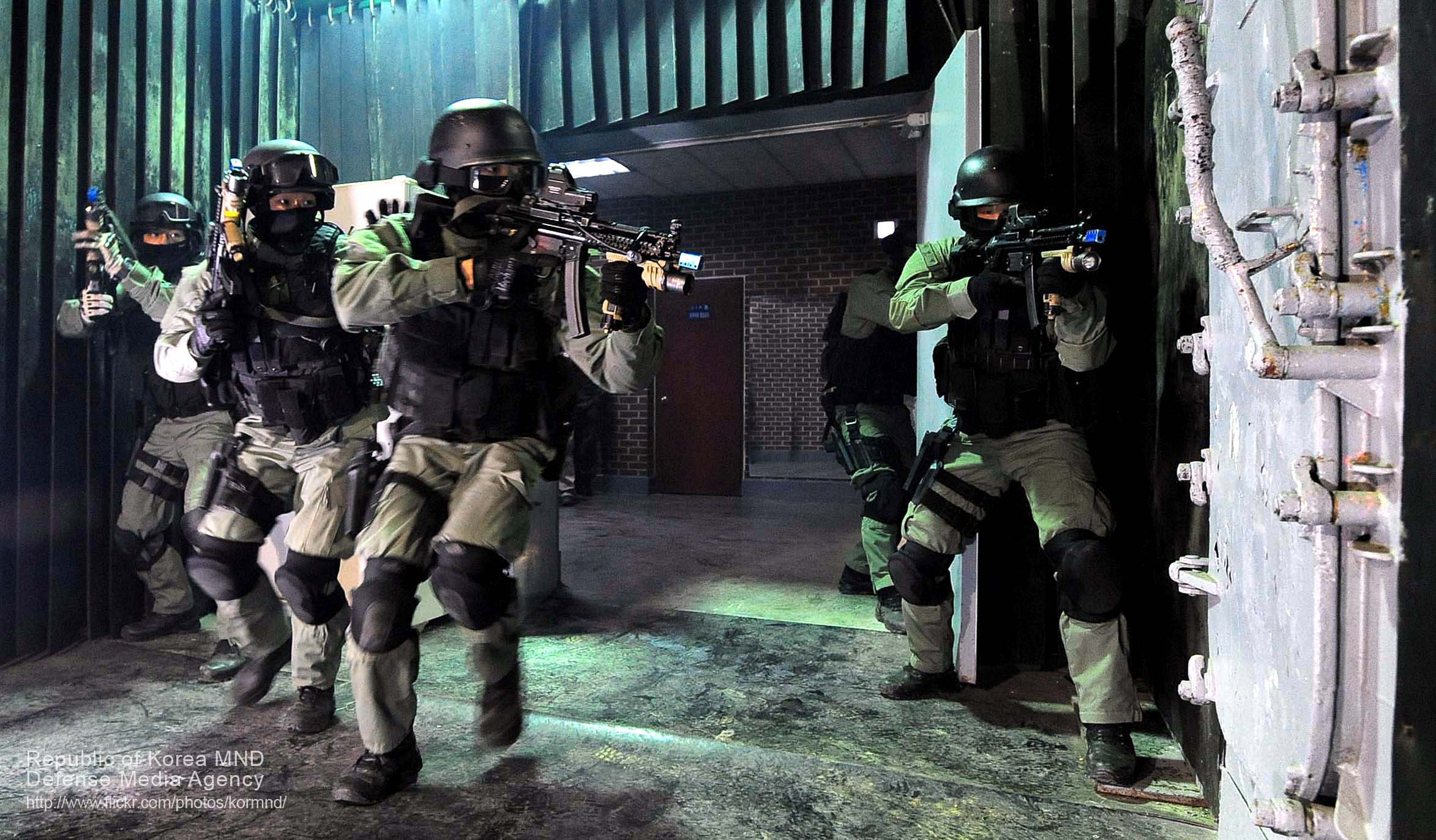
ROK naval commandos in a mock assault. They rescued captured tanker's crew from Somali pirates in 2011.

In preparation for an ocean-going navy, the ROK Navy established a task force called Maritime Task Flotilla Seven in February 2010.

Since 2009, a Chungmugong Yi Sunshin-class destroyer from the task force is being deployed as the Escort Task Group (Cheonghae) in response to piracy off the coast of Somalia. On January 21, 2011, naval commandos of the task group carried out an operation, and succeeded in rescuing the crew of the hijacked MV Samho Jewelry. As a humanitarian operation, the unit was dispatched to evacuate South Koreans and foreign nationals from war-torn Libya in 2011 and 2014.

The ROK Navy completed a new naval base called Jeju Civilian-Military Complex Port in February 2016 on the southern coast of Jeju Island to protect the sea lines of communication. In order to support ocean-going operations, the ROK Navy commissioned the 10,000-ton logistics support ship, ROKS Soyang (AOE 51), and launched the first locally designed 3,000-ton submarine, Dosan Ahn Changho (SS 083) in September 2018.

The ROK Navy continued shipbuilding programs to upgrade its fleet with local shipbuilders. In order to replace the aging Pohang-class corvettes and Ulsan-class frigates, and to take over multi-role operations such as coast patrol and anti-submarine warfare, the ROK Navy commissioned six 2,300-ton Incheon-class frigates between 2013 and 2016, and the lead ship (FFG 818) of the 2,800-ton Daegu-class frigates in March 2018. Two ex-USN Edenton-class salvage and rescue ships were replaced with two locally built 3,500-ton Tongyeong-class ships between 2014 and 2016. The Navy commissioned a 3,000-ton minelayer, ROKS Nampo (MLS 570), in June 2017. The lead ship of the PKX-B fast rocket craft, ROKS Chamsuri 211 (PKMR 211), was commissioned in November 2017 to relieve the aging fleet of Chamsuri-class patrol craft. The ROK Navy commissioned four 4,500-ton Cheonwangbong-class dock landing ships between 2014 and 2018. In May 2018, the Navy launched the Marado (LPH 6112), which was the second ship of the Dokdo-class amphibious transport dock. In June 2018, the Navy launched a 4,500-ton training ship, the Hansando (ATH 81), which was also designed as a casualty receiving and treatment ship (CRTS).

In October 2018, the Navy hosted its third international fleet review off the coast of Jeju Island.

In 2019, the Navy updated its strategic vision for the 100th anniversary of the ROK Navy as "Navy Vision 2045". As part of the vision, Admiral Sim Seung-seob, the Chief of Naval Operations proposed to build an ICT-based, system-driven "Smart Navy".

=== Aircraft carrier ambitions ===
Since the 1990s, the ROK Navy has been planning to acquire an aircraft carrier force as part of its commitment to become a blue-water navy. The symbol of the ROK Navy that was introduced in 2000 depicts the Navy's aircraft carrier ambitions. In 2005 and 2018 the ROK Navy launched two 18,800-ton Dokdo-class amphibious ships (LPH), equipped with a full-length flight deck and facilities for operating helicopters.

In August 2020, the Ministry of National Defense formally announced its intent to begin construction of a 30,000-ton light aircraft carrier. It is expected to purchase F-35B aircraft from the United States for the carrier. It was authorized as the CVX program in February 2021.

== Organization ==
The Republic of Korea Navy includes the Republic of Korea Navy Headquarters, Republic of Korea Fleet, Republic of Korea Marine Corps, Naval Education and Training Command, Naval Logistics Command, and Naval Academy. The Chief of Naval Operations (CNO) is the highest-ranking officer of the ROK Navy.

=== Republic of Korea Navy Headquarters ===
The ROK Navy is led by the Chief of Naval Operations (CNO). The Republic of Korea Navy Headquarters is located within the Gyeryongdae complex, the tri-service headquarters in Gyeryong, includes the office of the Chief of Naval Operations and various agencies and staff functions.

The CNO is a four-star admiral and a member of the Joint Chiefs of Staff. The CNO oversees the administration of organizing, recruiting, training, equipping, supplying, and mobilizing the ROK Navy. Despite the title, the Chief of Naval Operations does not have operational command authority over combat units (i.e. Republic of Korea Fleet, Republic of Korea Marine Corps). The CNO is an administrative position based in the Gyeryongdae complex, and exercises supervision of Navy organizations as the designee of the Minister of National Defense. Operational command of combat units falls within the purview of the Chairman of the Joint Chiefs of Staff who reports to the Minister of National Defense.

=== Republic of Korea Fleet (Navy Operations Command) ===
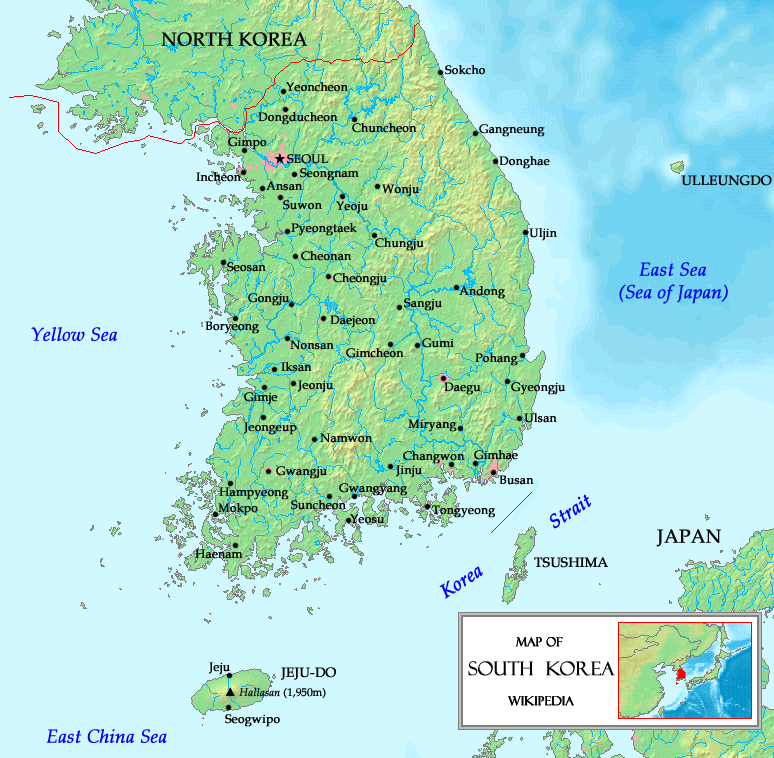
Map of South Korea

The Republic of Korea Fleet, the highest operational command of the ROK Navy, was established in September 1953. Headquartered at Busan Naval Base, the Commander Republic of Korea Fleet (formerly Commander-in-Chief Republic of Korea Fleet) is responsible for naval operations. COMROKFLT, a three-star admiral, also serves as the Commander Naval Component Command (CNCC) of the ROK-US Combined Forces Command (CFC).

The Republic of Korea Fleet has three numbered fleets each assigned to the seas east, west, and south of South Korea:

- First Fleet (HQ: Donghae)

- Maritime Battle Group One

- Second Fleet (HQ: Pyeongtaek)

- Maritime Battle Group Two
- Incheon Naval Sector Defense Command (HQ: Incheon)

- Third Fleet (HQ: Mokpo)

- Maritime Battle Group Three

For various types of naval operations, the ROK Fleet has a task force, a submarine force, a naval aviation force, a surface flotilla, a special warfare force, and units for combat readiness and meteorology/oceanography:

- Task Fleet (Task Squadron 71/72/73, Mobile Logistics Squadron 77)
- Submarine Force Command
- Naval Air Command
- Mine/Amphibious Flotilla Five (Mine Squadron 52, Amphibious Squadron 53, Naval Mobile Construction Squadron 59)
- Battle Training Group Eight
- Naval Special Warfare Flotilla (including UDT/SEAL, EOD, and Sea Salvage & Rescue Unit (SSU))
- Maritime Intelligence Group

- Numbered fleets

In 1986, the ROK Navy reorganized its patrol forces into three fleets: the First Fleet, Second Fleet, and Third Fleet. The three numbered fleets, each is led by a rear admiral (upper half), are responsible for protecting the coastal water around South Korea: The First Fleet is for the eastern naval sector, the Second Fleet is for the western naval sector and the Third Fleet is for the southern naval sector including Jeju Island. Each fleet includes a Maritime Battle Group, Logistics Squadron, Base Squadron, and Training Squadron. The Maritime Battle Group comprises squadrons of patrol forces composed of Kwanggaeto the Great-class destroyers, Daegu-class and Incheon-class frigates, Ulsan-class frigates, Pohang-class corvettes, and patrol vessels (Yoon Youngha-class fast missile craft, Chamsuri 211-class fast rocket craft, Chamsuri-class fast patrol boats).

- Task Fleet

Since the 1990s, the ROK Navy has been trying to build an ocean-going fleet to protect the sea lines of communication. In 2001, President Kim Dae-jung revealed that the Navy will have a task force called "Strategic Task Fleet" (Jeollyak-gidong-hamdae), which will "protect national interests in the five oceans and contribute to world peace."

As part of the plan, the ROK Navy established a task force called Maritime Task Flotilla Seven on February 1, 2010, which evolved from the ASW Squadron 51 of the Component Flotilla Five. The Flotilla Seven was reorganized into the Task Fleet on February 1, 2025. It is led by a rear admiral (upper half), and headquartered at Jeju Naval Base in Jeju Island. The task force is responsible for the defense of South Korea against sea-borne threats and protection of its sea lines of communication. The Task Fleet includes four surface squadrons: The Task Squadron 71/72/73 are composed of three Sejong the Great-class AEGIS guided-missile destroyers and six Chungmugong Yi Sunshin-class destroyers; the Mobile Logistics Squadron 77 is composed of Soyang-class and Cheonji-class fast combat support ships.

A Chungmugong Yi Sunshin-class destroyer of the Task Fleet is being deployed as the Escort Task Group (Cheonghae) in response to piracy in shipping lanes off the coast of Somalia. As a humanitarian operation, ROKS Munmu the Great (DDH 976) of the task group was dispatched to evacuate South Koreans and foreign nationals from war-torn Libya in 2014.

The ROK Navy plans to equip the Task Fleet with 18 destroyers.

- Submarine Force Command

Headquartered in Jinhae, the Submarine Force Command was established in February 2015. The ROK Navy's submarine unit had a humble beginning with three Dolgorae-class midget submarines in June 1990. After acquiring ROKS Chang Bogo (SS 061), a Type 209-class submarine, the Submarine Squadron 57 of the Component Flotilla Five was upgraded to the Submarine Flotilla Nine in October 1995. Since then, it has been playing the role of the ROK Navy's core strength.

The Submarine Force Command, which is led by a rear admiral (upper half), includes six Submarine Squadrons with Type 214 submarines (Sohn Wonyil class) and Type 209 submarines (Chang Bogo class). In September 2018, the ROK Navy launched the first locally designed 3,000-ton submarine, ROKS Dosan Ahn Changho (SS 083).

The Submarine Force Command offers the International Submarine Education & Training Program (ISETP) for submariners around the world.

- Naval Air Command

Headquartered in Pohang, the Naval Air Command is responsible for the operation of naval aircraft. South Korean naval flying started in 1951, with the reconstruction of a former USAF T-6 Texan for naval duties. In 1957, the ROK Navy established the Fleet Aviation Unit, which became the Fleet Air Wing in 1977 when the Navy strengthened its naval aviation force by acquiring Grumman S-2 Tracker ASW aircraft and Aérospatiale Alouette III helicopters. In 1986, the Fleet Air Wing was renamed the Air Wing Six. In 2022, the ROK Navy upgraded the Air Wing Six to the Naval Air Command.

The Naval Air Command has naval air stations in Pohang (K-3), Mokpo (K-15), Jinhae (K-10), and a detached unit at Jeju International Airport. The Naval Air Command, which is led by a rear admiral (upper half), includes three air groups, and operates about 70 fixed-wing and rotary-wing aircraft such as P-8 Poseidon maritime patrol aircraft and AW159 Wildcat ASW helicopters.

- Mine/Amphibious Flotilla Five

Headquartered in Jinhae, the Mine/Amphibious Flotilla Five (formerly Component Flotilla Five) has been the matrix of various units conducting naval component operations such as anti-submarine warfare (ASW), mine warfare, amphibious warfare, salvage and special operations. As a successor to the Flotilla One and Flotilla Two, the Component Flotilla Five was founded in 1986 with the ASW Squadron 51 (later to become Maritime Task Flotilla Seven), Mine Squadron 52, Amphibious Squadron 53, Service Squadron 55 (later Sea Salvage & Rescue Unit), and Special Warfare Squadron 56 (later Naval Special Warfare Flotilla). In 1990 and 2007, the Submarine Squadron 57 (later Submarine Force Command) and Training Squadron 509 (later Battle Training Group Eight) were established respectively. As of December 2018, the Flotilla Five was composed of the Mine Squadron 52, Amphibious Squadron 53, and Naval Mobile Construction Squadron 59. The Commander Mine/Amphibious Flotilla Five is a rear admiral (lower half).

=== Republic of Korea Marine Corps ===
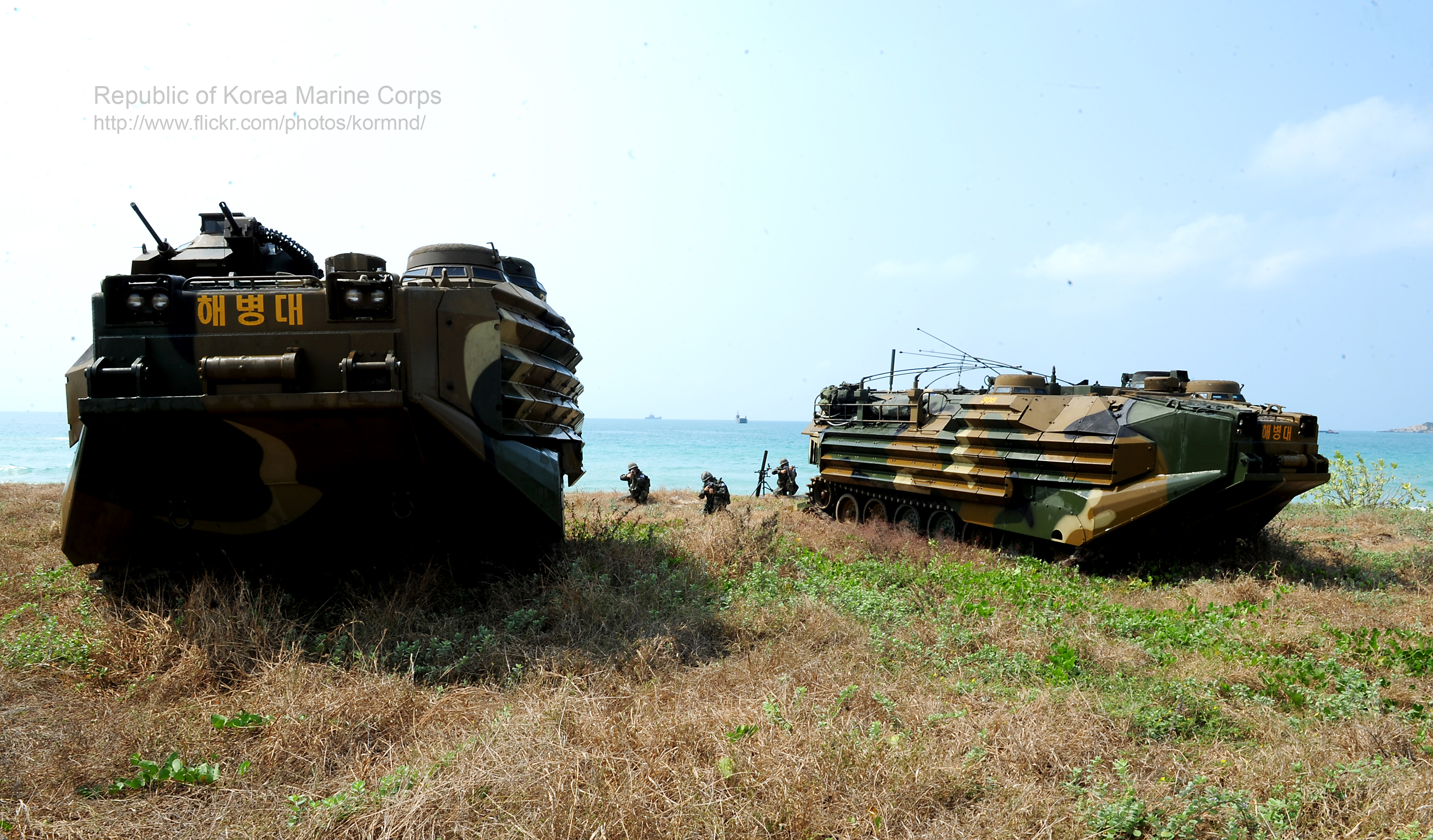
KAAV7A1 assault amphibious vehicles of the ROKMC at Cobra Gold 2014 in Thailand

The ROK Navy includes the Republic of Korea Marine Corps, which functions as a branch of the Navy. The ROK Marine Corps is responsible for conducting amphibious operations with the ROK Navy. The Marine Corps, with 29,000 personnel, is organized into two divisions and two brigades under the Headquarters ROK Marine Corps. The Commandant of the Republic of Korea Marine Corps is a three-star general. The ROK Marine Corps has about 300 tracked vehicles including assault amphibious vehicles, main battle tanks, and self-propelled artillery.

=== Shore establishments ===
- Naval Education and Training Command

Headquartered in Jinhae, the Naval Education and Training Command is one of the two major shore commands of the ROK Navy. The Command is responsible for training, education and professional development of the Navy's active duty Sailors. One of its primary roles is to conduct the initial orientation and basic training for new recruits of the Navy and the Korea Coast Guard. The Naval Reserve Officer Training Corps (NROTC) is under the Naval Education and Training Command. The Naval Education and Training Command is led by a vice admiral.

- Naval Logistics Command

The Naval Logistics Command is the other major shore command of the ROK Navy. It is located in Jinhae. The Command delivers logistics and support to the Navy, and is committed to the Navy's combat readiness. It includes the Naval Ship Yard, the Naval Supply Center, the Naval Ordnance Ammunition Center, and the Naval Technology Research Institute. The Naval Logistics Command is led by a rear admiral (upper half).

- Republic of Korea Naval Academy

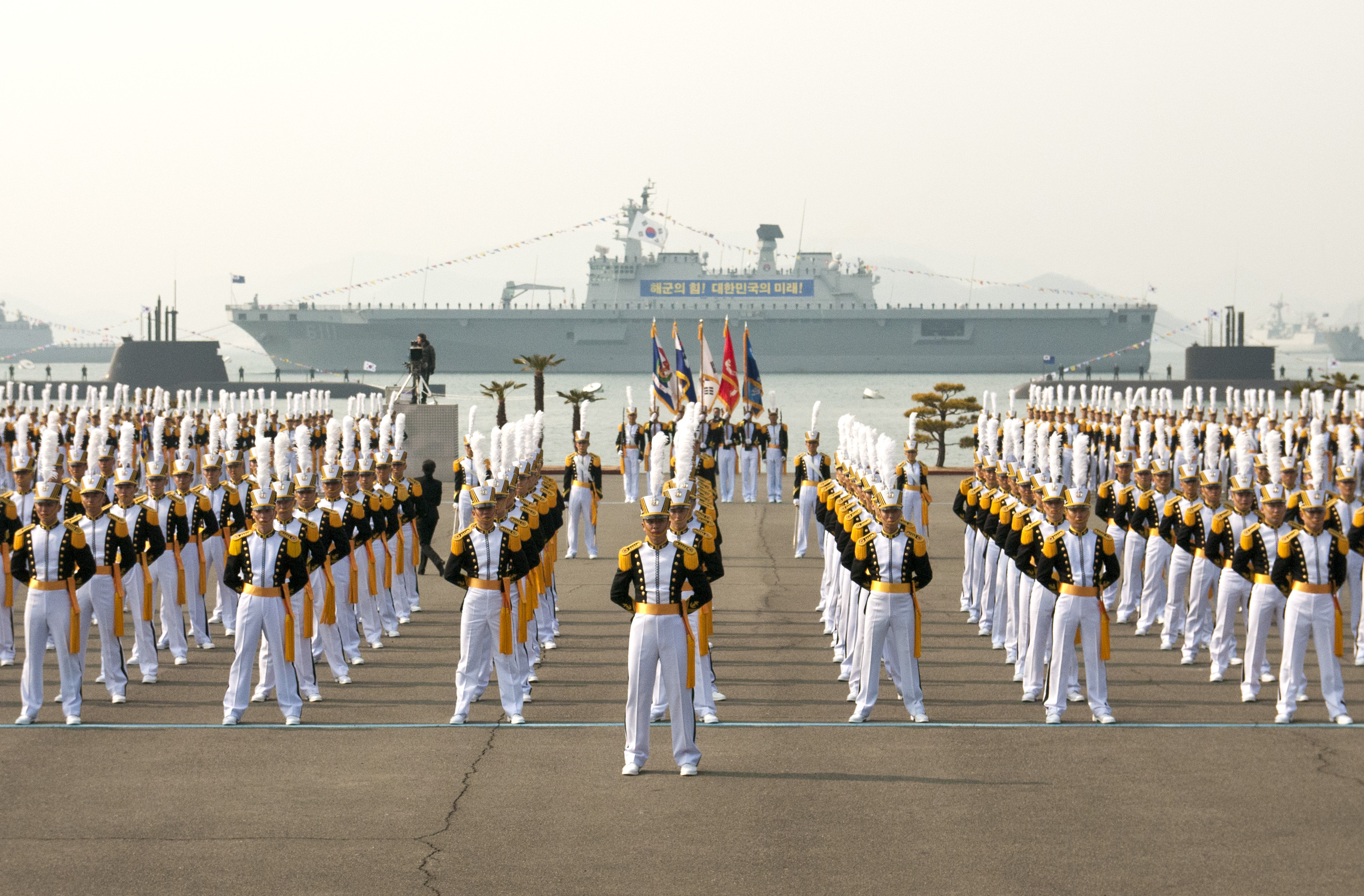
Midshipmen stand in formation at the ROK Naval Academy graduation ceremony

The Republic of Korea Naval Academy is a four-year coeducational service academy located in Jinhae. It was established in 1946. Graduates are commissioned as Ensigns in the Navy or Second Lieutenants in the Marine Corps. The Naval Academy also hosts the Officer Candidate School (OCS), which provides training to become commissioned officers for civilian college graduates and candidates with military experience. The Superintendent of the ROK Naval Academy is a vice admiral.

=== U.S. naval units in South Korea ===
South Korea has a joint military partnership with the United States as outlined by the Mutual Defense Treaty signed in October 1953. The ROK Navy has worked closely with the U.S. Navy to promote regional stability.

Headquartered at Busan Naval Base, the Commander U.S. Naval Forces Korea (CNFK) is a shore command of the United States Navy that serves as the shore support agency for all U.S. naval activity in South Korea. The U.S. Naval Forces Korea was established in July 1957, with headquarters in Seoul.

Originally established as the U.S. Naval Advisory Group Chinhae Detachment, the Commander Fleet Activities Chinhae (CFAC) is a U.S. Navy installation in Jinhae.

== Bases ==
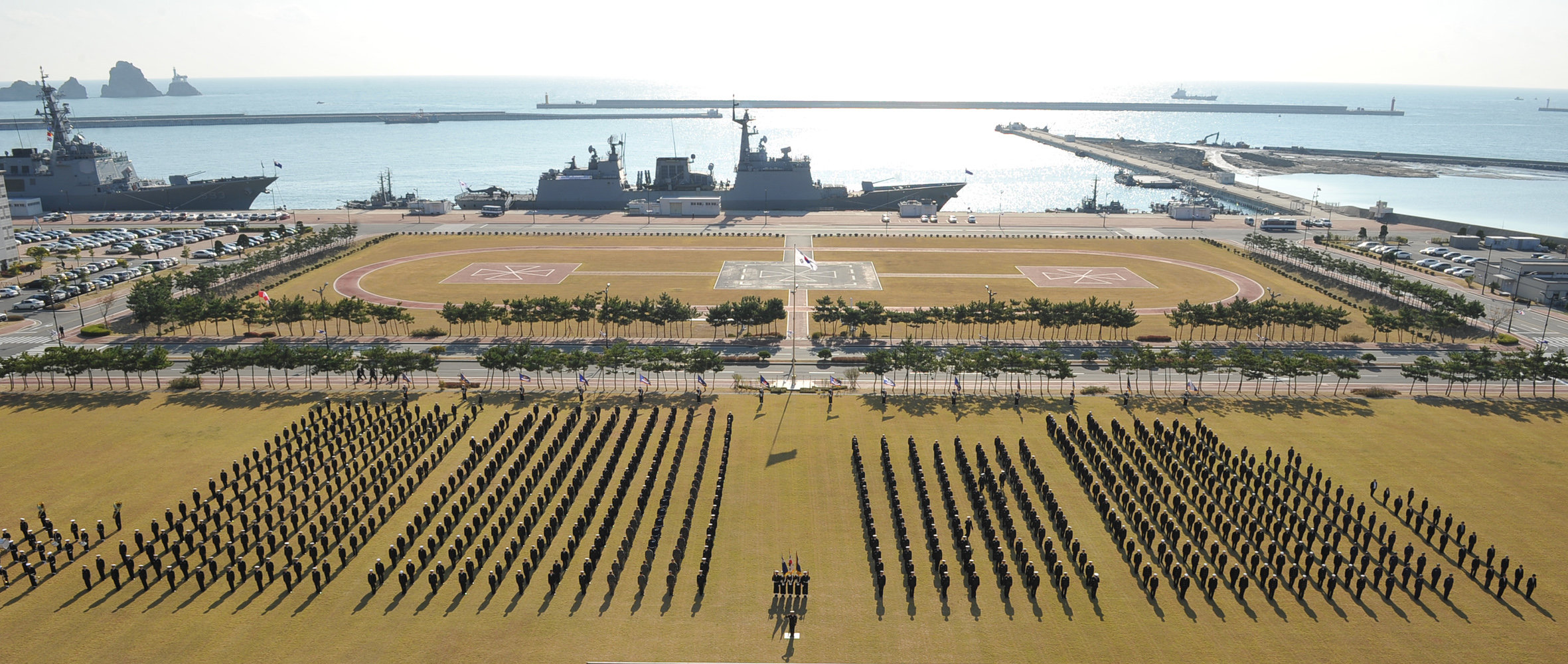
Busan Naval Base

The ROK Navy operates several naval bases in South Korea: Jinhae, Busan, Donghae, Pyeongtaek, Mokpo, Incheon, Pohang, Jeju Island, Baengnyeong Island. Naval air stations are in Pohang, Mokpo, and Jinhae.

Situated in the southeastern coast of the Korean Peninsula, Jinhae has been the major naval port in Korea since the Imperial Japanese Navy built a naval base during the Japanese occupation period. After Korea was liberated from the Empire of Japan, the Korean Coast Guard (later the ROK Navy) was formed in Jinhae. Jinhae Naval Base is the principal homeport of the Republic of Korea Fleet, and hosts vital naval facilities including the Naval Shipyard. The Jinhae Naval Base Command is responsible for protecting the area.

Located in South Korea's second most-populous city after Seoul, Busan Naval Base has become another major naval base for the ROK Fleet since its headquarters moved from Jinhae in 2007. The base can accommodate up to 30 naval ships as big as the Nimitz-class aircraft carrier.

Donghae, Pyeongtaek, and Mokpo hosts the headquarters of the First, Second and the Third Fleet respectively. Incheon hosts the Incheon Naval Sector Defense Command under a one-star admiral responsible for protecting littoral waters close to Seoul, the nation's capital. Pohang has a naval base for amphibious forces such as the 1st Marine Division ("Sea Dragon") located nearby.

=== Jeju Naval Base ===
In February 2016, the ROK Navy completed a new naval base on the southern coast of South Korea's largest island - Jeju, which lies in the Korea Strait. Jeju Naval Base was established to protect the sea lines of communication and to strengthen the Navy's control over the seas around South Korea. It is home of the Maritime Task Flotilla Seven and the Submarine Squadron 93. The base is also known as Jeju Civilian-Military Complex Port because it was designed to be jointly used by military and civilians; there is a pier and terminal for cruise ships. The base can host up to 20 naval vessels and two 150,000-ton cruise ships at the same time.

Jeju Naval Base was the venue for the international fleet review 2018 in October 2018.

== Personnel ==
The ROK Navy has about 70,000 personnel, including the 29,000 members of the ROK Marine Corps.

Military service is mandatory for all South Korean men. In the ROK Navy, all members are volunteers, with enlisted seamen serving for 20-month periods; commissioned officers, warrant officers, and petty officers serving longer terms than those of enlisted seamen, or as career. Women can volunteer as officers, warrant officers, or petty officers. In 2001, six female ensigns, who had become commissioned officers through the Officer Candidate School, were assigned to serve on surface ships of the ROK Navy, for the first time.

- Commissioned officers

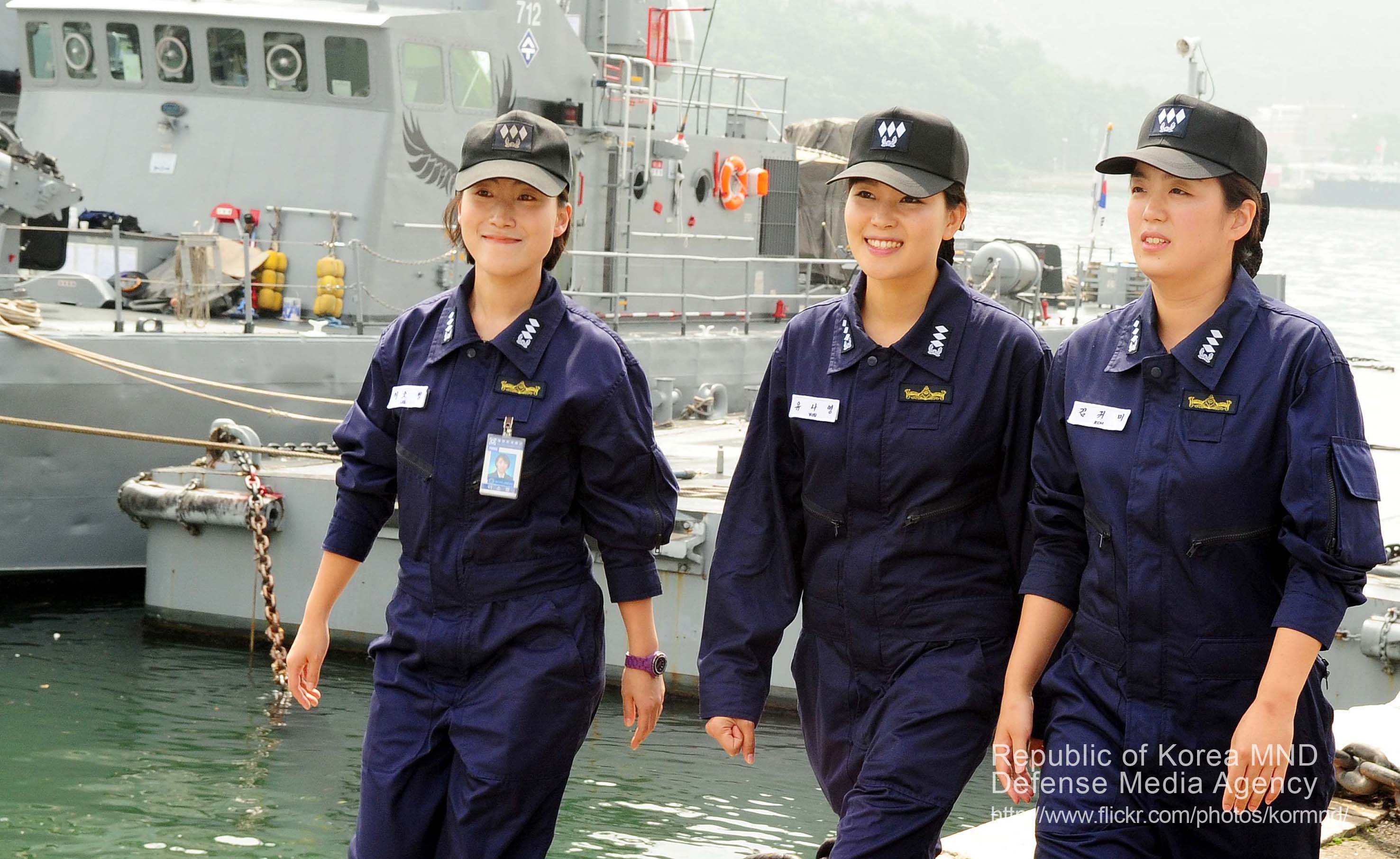
Three ROKN Lieutenants were appointed as the first female commanding officers of Chamsuri-class patrol boats in 2012.

There are several paths to becoming a commissioned officer in the ROK Navy, including the Naval Academy, Officer Candidate School (OCS), and Naval Reserve Officer Training Corps (NROTC). Officer Candidate School, located at the Naval Academy, Jinhae, provides training for candidates with current or prior enlisted experience in the military and civilian college graduates, which take majority in OCS.

- Warrant officers

The warrant officer rank in the South Korean armed forces falls in between that of non-commissioned and commissioned officers. In the ROK Navy, warrant officers are mostly former non-commissioned officers who had earned the rating of Sangsa (Chief petty officer) or Wonsa (Master chief petty officer) and who had been selected for and completed the warrant officer candidate program. Other routes include the naval aviation program and Air Intercept Controller (AIC) program; a small number of warrant officers serve as language officers who specialize in English translation and interpretation.

Warrant officers mess in the wardroom with commissioned officers.

- Petty officers

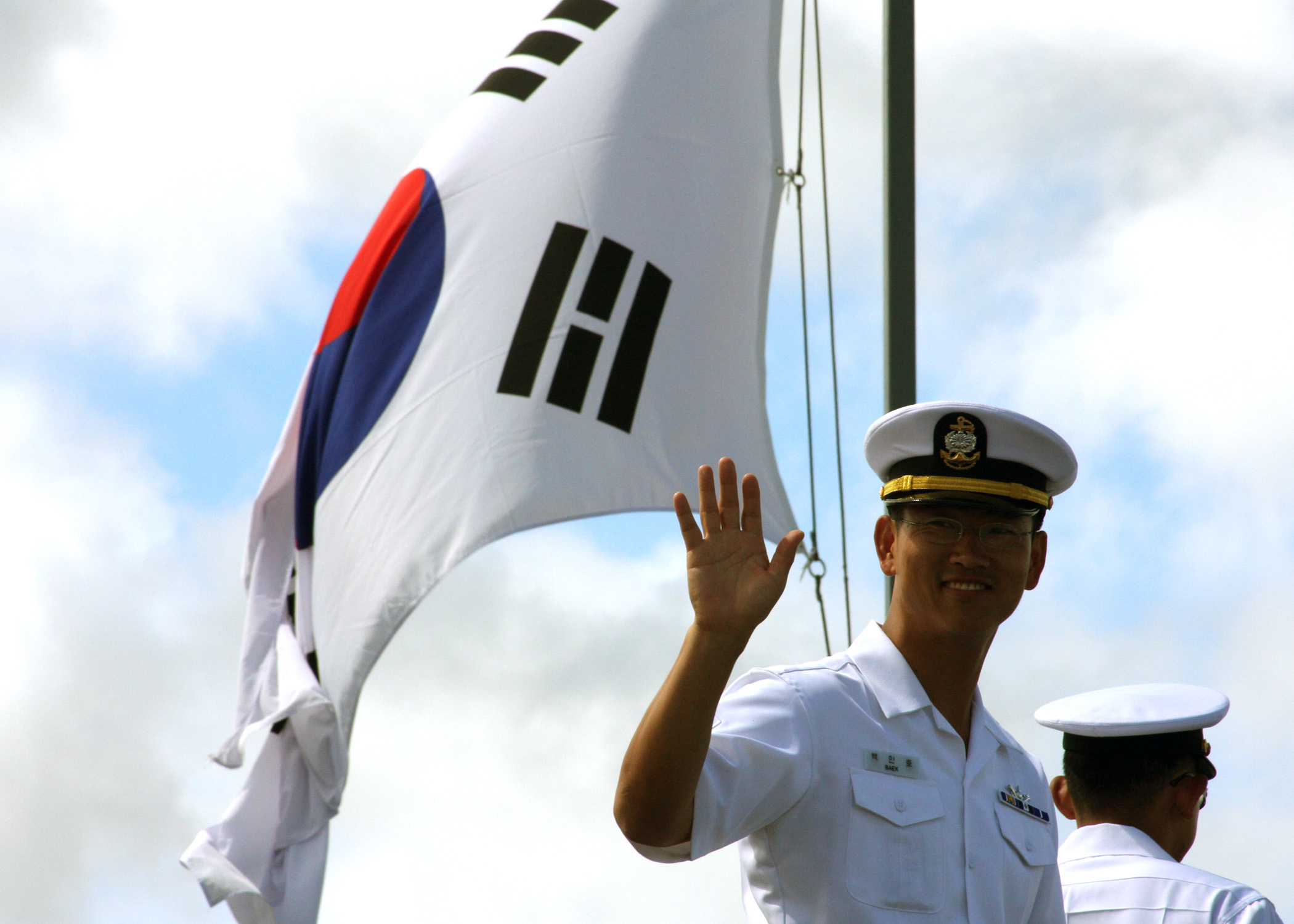
A South Korean navy petty officer aboard ROKS Munmu the Great (DDH 976) waves to onlookers pier side.

Petty officers originate from a petty officer candidate program, which trains military personnel and civilians who take majority - seamen experience is not required to become petty officers. In the ROK Navy, personnel with ranks of Hasa (Petty officer) through Wonsa are considered petty officers (i.e. non-commissioned officers). Those at Sangsa and Wonsa are further referred to as "CPO" (chief petty officer) collectively and considered a separate community within the Navy. "CPO"s have privileges such as separate dining and living areas.

There are the appointments of Juim-wonsa and Juim-sangsa equivalent to that of the U.S. Navy's command master chief petty officer (CMDCM). The positions are filled by senior Wonsa and Sangsa respectively and unlike their U.S. Navy counterparts, the ROK Navy Juim-wonsa and Juim-sangsa wear the same standard rate insignia of Wonsa or Sangsa with an identification badge.

- Seamen

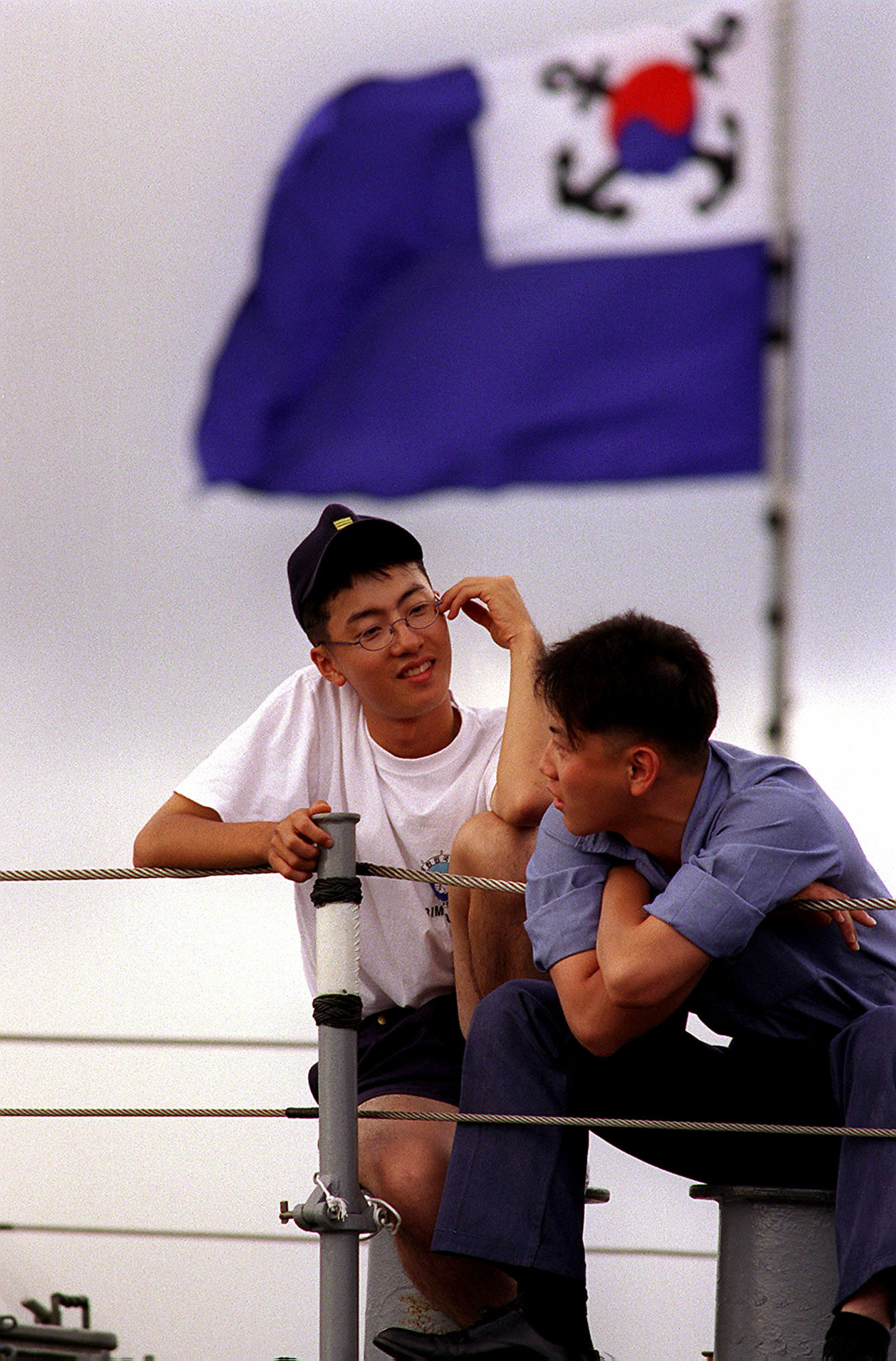
Two South Korean navy seamen find the time to relax.

In the ROK Navy, seamen are referred to as "Subyeong" (Korean: 수병; Hanja: 水兵). Normally the enlisted seamen serve in the Navy for 20 months; civilian recruits get initial trainings at the basic military training center in Jinhae as Ideungbyeong (Seaman 2nd class). After completing their military services as Byeongjang (Leading seaman), most of them are transferred from active duty to the naval reserve. Others continue the military service as Hasa (Petty officer) and may become career petty officers.

=== Uniforms ===
ROK Navy uniforms were influenced by US Navy uniforms with some notable differences. Petty officers, not just chief petty officers, wear uniforms identical to that of a commissioned officer's uniform except with different insignia, and petty officers wear a combination cap with a white cover and a gold chinstrap. Seamen wear dungaree trousers, chambray shirts and "dixie cup" hats as their work uniforms. Honor guards and musicians of the navy bands of seaman rates wear sailor caps bearing "Republic of Korea Navy" in Hangul with the dress uniforms.

A new shipboard working uniform similar to the NWU Type I has been issued since 2021.

=== Ranks and rates ===
In the ROK Navy, as in the rest of the ROK Armed Forces, ranks fall into one of four categories: commissioned officer, warrant officer, petty officer (non-commissioned officer), and seaman, in decreasing order of authority. Commissioned officer ranks are subdivided into flag officers, senior officers (lieutenant commander through captain), and junior officers (ensign through lieutenant).

ROK Navy commissioned officer ranks have two distinct sets of rank insignia: On dress uniform a series of stripes similar to Commonwealth naval ranks are worn; on service uniforms, working uniforms, and special uniform situations (combat utilities and flight suits), the rank insignia are the same as the equivalent rank in the Army or the Air Force. The warrant officer rank insignia is denoted by a gold-colored Sowi insignia, and a single broken stripe.

All three branches – the Army, the Navy, and the Air Force of the ROK Armed Forces share the same rank insignia and the same names of ranks in Korean.

Commissioned officer

Rank group	Flag officers					Senior officers			Junior officers
Republic of Korea Navy
Republic of Korea Navy	원수; Wonsu	대장; Daejang	중장; Jungjang	소장; Sojang	준장; Junjang	대령; Daeryeong	중령; Jungnyeong	소령; Soryeong	대위; Daewi	중위; Jungwi	소위; Sowi

Warrant officer

Rank group	Warrant officer
Republic of Korea Navy
Republic of Korea Navy	준위; Junwi

Enlisted

Rank group	Petty officers				Seamen
Republic of Korea Navy
Republic of Korea Navy	원사; Wonsa	상사; Sangsa	중사; Jungsa	하사; Hasa	병장; Byeongjang	상등병; Sangdeungbyeong	일등병; Ildeungbyeong	이등병; Ideungbyeong

== International activities ==
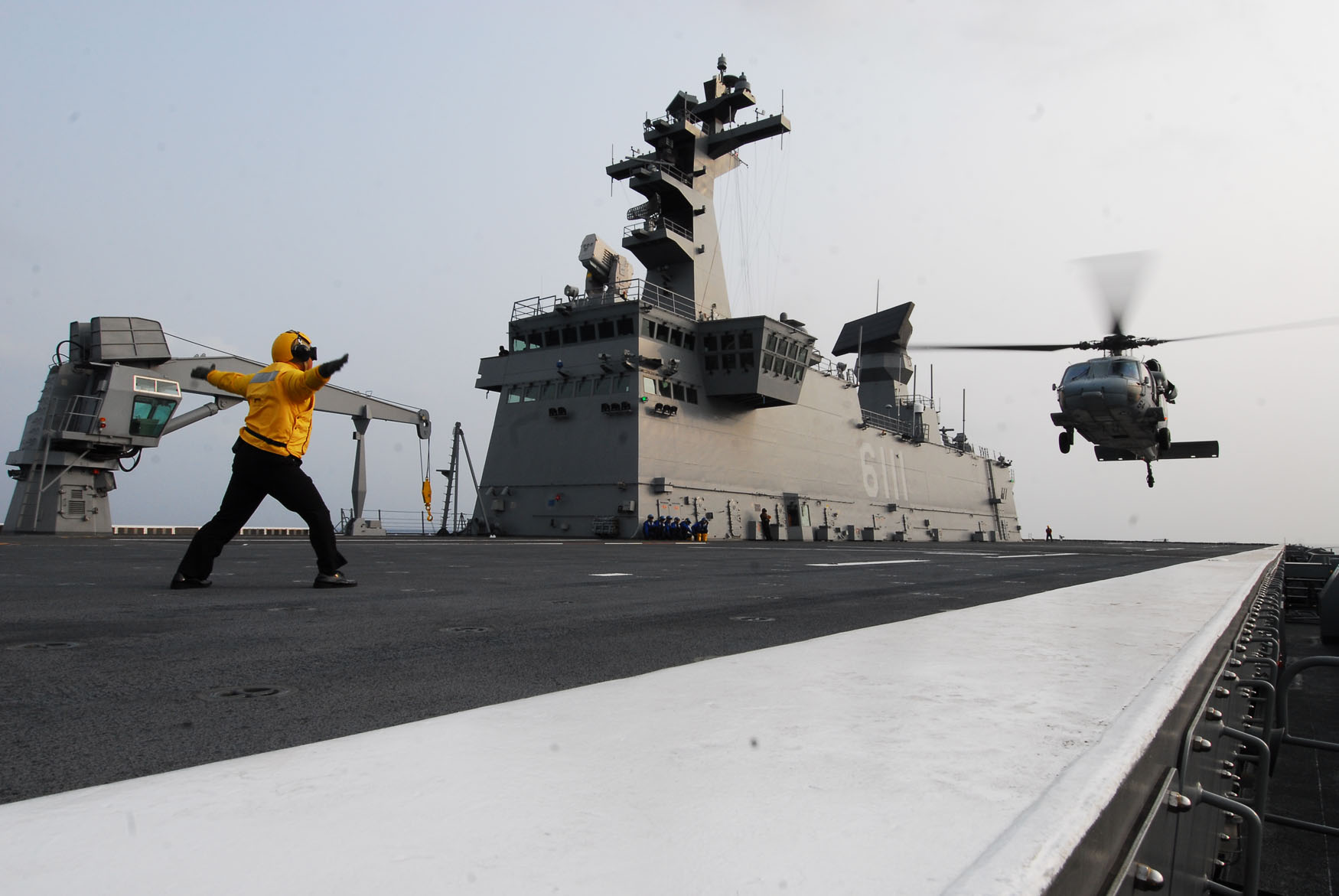
A U.S. Navy MH-60S landing on the flight deck of ROKS Dokdo (LPH 6111) during the Korean Interoperability Training Program

The ROK Navy frequently participates in multinational exercises and international activities. Also it has engaged in several peacekeeping operations since the turn of the 21st century.

- Cruise Training: since 1954, the ROK Navy has conducted the annual ocean-going training with the fourth year midshipmen (naval cadets) of the Naval Academy to provide on the job training before commissioning them and to foster relations with other navies around the world. In 1992, the ROK Navy ships - ROKS Chungnam (FF 953) and ROKS Masan (FF 955) of the Cruise Training Unit circumnavigated the world for the first time.
- Navy to Navy Talks: the ROK Navy holds regular naval conferences with its counterparts of Germany, India, Indonesia, Japan, Malaysia, Singapore, Thailand, Turkey, the United Kingdom, and United States.
- Pacific Reach: the ROK Navy has participated in the biannual submarine rescue exercise since 2000. In 2004, the ROK Navy hosted the exercise, which was the first multinational naval exercise the ROK Navy ever hosted.
- RIMPAC: the ROK Naval forces have participated in the biannual multilateral naval exercise since 1990.
- ROKN-JMSDF SAREX: the ROK Navy and Japan Maritime Self Defense Force (JMSDF) conducted the search and rescue exercise biannually since 1999.
- WP MCMEX/DIVEX: the mine warfare forces of the ROK Navy have participated in the Western Pacific Mine Counter Measure Exercise/Diving Exercise since 2004.
- Cobra Gold: together with the ROK Marines, the ROK Navy has participated in Cobra Gold since 2010.
- ROK-US combined amphibious landing exercise: The ROK Navy and ROKMC together with the U.S. Navy and U.S. Marine Corps conduct the exercise annually in Korea.

=== Counter-piracy operations ===
Since March 2009, the ROK Navy has deployed the Escort Task Group (Cheonghae) in response to piracy in shipping lanes off the coast of Somalia. The task group is composed of a Chungmugong Yi Sunshin-class destroyer and about 30 naval special warfare personnel. The group operates as part of the multinational task force, Combined Task Force 151 of Combined Maritime Forces (CMF). ROKS Munmu the Great was the first ship to be deployed as part of the unit to Somali waters. On January 21, 2011, South Korean naval commandos of the task group carried out Operation Dawn of Gulf of Aden, an operation to rescue the crew of the hijacked MV Samho Jewelry and succeed in rescuing the crew and killing or capturing all of the pirates on board.

As of March 2019, about 8,500 sailors were deployed to the Gulf of Aden in 28 Escort Task Groups, which had escorted about 22,000 ships since the first deployment.

=== International fleet review ===
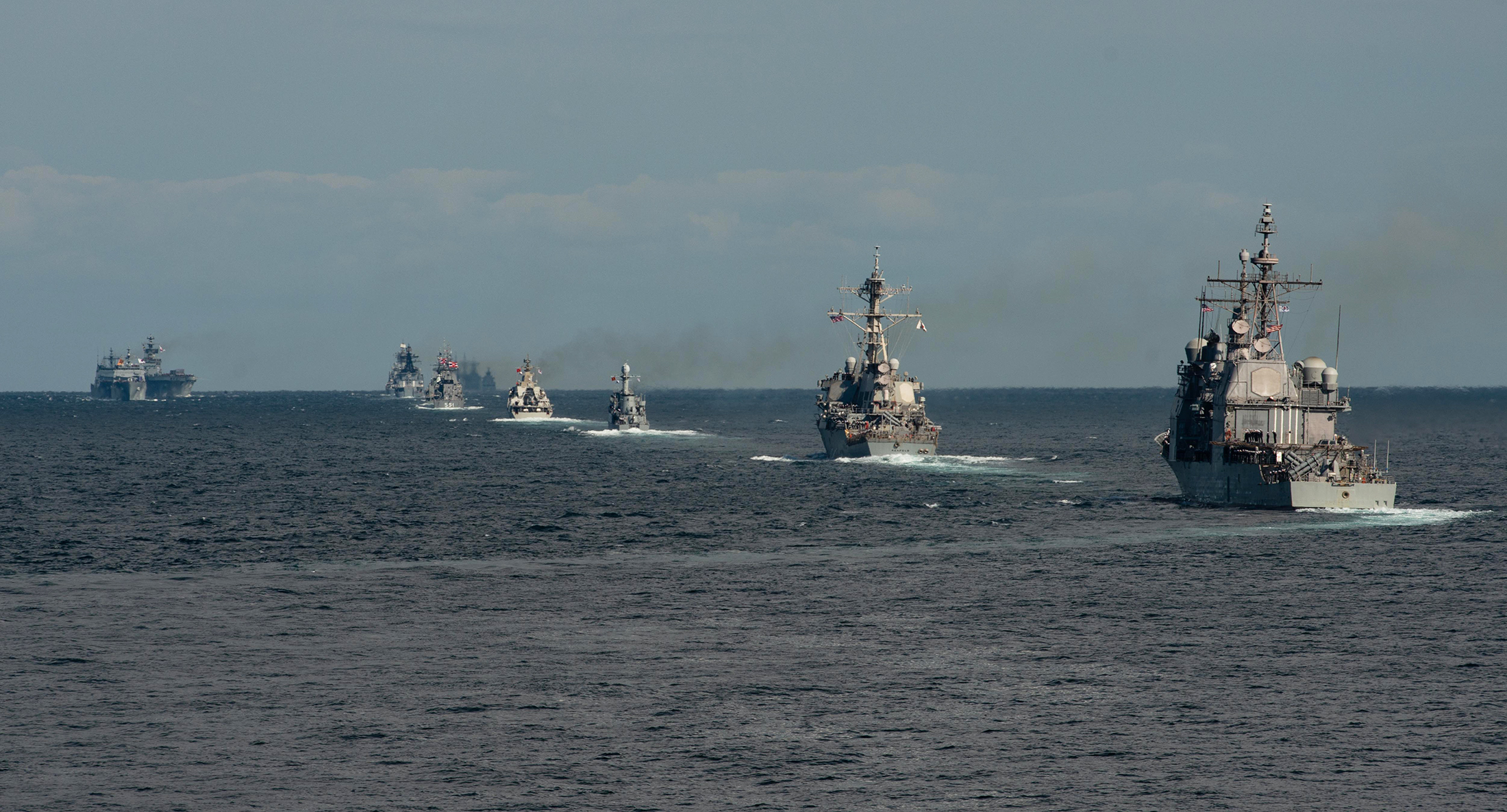
Multinational ships steam in formation at the ROK international Fleet Review 2018

In October 1998, the ROK Navy hosted its first international fleet review in commemoration of the 50th anniversary of the Republic of Korea and its armed forces off coast of Busan and Jinhae. 21 ships from 11 countries (Australia, Bangladesh, France, India, Indonesia, Japan, New Zealand, Philippines, Singapore, United Kingdom, United States) participated in the fleet review as well as 34 ships and 15 aircraft from South Korea. The ROK Navy hosted its second international fleet review off coast of Busan in October 2008 to celebrate the 60th anniversary of the South Korean government. 22 ships from 11 countries (Australia, Canada, China, India, Indonesia, Japan, Russia, Singapore, Thailand, United Kingdom, United States) participated in the fleet review as well as 33 ships and 27 aircraft from South Korea.

The Cruise Training Unit – ROKS Kwanggaeto the Great (DDH 971), ROKS Jeju (FF 958) and ROKS Cheonji (AOE 57) participated in International Fleet Review 2002 commemorating the 50th anniversary of JMSDF in Tokyo Bay. The Cruise Training Fleet – ROKS Chungmugong Yi Sunshin (DDH 975) and ROKS Cheonji (AOE 57) – visited the United Kingdom in order to take part in the International Fleet Review for Trafalgar 200 in 2005. In April 2009, ROKS Dokdo (LPH 6111) and ROKS Gang Gam-chan (DDH-979) attended an international fleet review to celebrate the 60th anniversary of the founding of the Chinese People's Liberation Army (PLA) Navy in Qingdao. In August 2009, the Cruise Training Flotilla – ROKS Choi Young (DDH 981) and ROKS Daecheong (AOE 58) participated in the Indonesian International Fleet Review, which commemorates the 64th anniversary of Indonesian independence.

The ROK Navy hosted its third international fleet review off coast of Jeju Island in October 2018. 15 ships from 9 countries (Australia, Brunei, Canada, India, Russia, Singapore, Thailand, United States, Vietnam) participated in the pass-in-review as well as 24 ships and 24 aircraft from South Korea. In April 2019, ROKS Gyeonggi (FFG 812) attended an international fleet review to celebrate the 70th anniversary of the PLA Navy in Qingdao.

== Equipment ==
There are about 150 commissioned ships with the ROK Navy (a total displacement of about 350,000 tonnes). The naval aviation force consists of about 70 fixed-wing and rotary-wing aircraft.

=== Ships ===
The vessels are categorized into four levels. A first-rate ship (Sohn Wonyil–class SS, DDG, DDH, LPH, MLS, and AOE) is commanded by a captain; a second-rate ship (SS, FFG, FF, PCC, LST, ATS, and ASR) by a commander; a third-rate ship (PKG, MSH, and MHC) by a lieutenant commander; and a fourth-rate craft (PKMR, PKM, and LSF) is commanded by a lieutenant or a warrant officer.

The ROK Navy employs the U.S. Navy–style letter based hull classification symbols to designate the types of its ships and hull numbers to uniquely identify its vessels (e.g. DDH 975 (Note: The ROK Navy does not use the number '4' when assigning hull numbers to their ships.)). The names are that of the historical figures, Navy heroes, provinces, cities, counties, peaks, lakes, islands, and birds. The Chief of Naval Operations selects the names of ships.

The ship prefix for all the commissioned ROK Navy ship is ROKS (Republic of Korea Ship) when the names of ships are written in English.

Class	Image	ROKN classification	Displacement (light/full tons)	First deployment	Commissioned	Launched	Note
Submarines
Dosan Ahn Changho class		SS: Submarine	3,750 (submerged)	2021	3	1	KSS-III Batch-I; 3 in batch
Sohn Wonyil class	ROKS Ahn Junggeun, a Sohn Wonyil-class submarine	SS: Submarine	1,860 (submerged)	2007	9	-	SS-II (9 in class); Capable of launching cruise missiles
Jang Bogo class	ROKS Lee Eokgi (SS 071)	SS: Submarine	1,290 (submerged)	1993	8	-	SS-I (Being upgraded)
Destroyers
Sejong the Great class	ROKS Sejong the Great (Sejong the Great class)	DDG: Destroyer Guided-missile	7,650/10,600	2008	4	1	
Chungmugong Yi Sun-sin class	ROKS Munmu the Great (DDH 976), a Chungmugong Yi Sunshin-class destroyer	DDH: Destroyer Helicopter	4,500/5,520	2003	6	-	DDH-II; To be followed by KDDX
Gwanggaeto the Great class	ROKS Kwanggaeto the Great (DDH 971), the Navy's first indigenously built destroyer	DDH: Destroyer Helicopter	3,200/3,900	1998	3	-	DDH-I
Frigates
Chungnam class		FFG: Frigate Guided-missile	3,600/4,300	2024	1	2	FFG-III (FFX Batch-III; 6 in batch)
Daegu class	ROKS Seoul (Daegu class)	FFG: Frigate Guided-missile	3,100/3,650	2018	8	-	FFG-II
Incheon class	ROKS Incheon (Incheon class)	FFG: Frigate Guided-missile	2,500/3,251	2013	6	-	FFG-I
Ulsan class	ROKS Busan (Ulsan class)	FF: Frigate	1,446/2,350	1981	2	-	To be replaced by FFG
Corvettes
Pohang class	ROKS Bucheon (Pohang class)	PCC: Patrol Combat Corvette	950/1,220	1984	2	-	To be replaced by FFG
Patrol vessels
Yoon Youngha class	ROKS Hyun Sihak (Yoon Youngha class)	PKG: Patrol Killer Guided-missile	440/570	2008	18	-	-
Chamsuri (PKMR 211) class	-	PKMR: Patrol Killer Medium Rocket	210/250	2017	16	4	PKX-B Batch-I (16 in batch), Batch-II (18 in batch)
Chamsuri class	A Chamsuri-class patrol craft and a Sohn Wonyil-class submarine on background	PKM: Patrol Killer Medium	151/170	1978	26	-	To be replaced by PKG & PKMR
Amphibious warfare ships
Dokdo class	Amphibious transport dock, ROKS Dokdo (LPH 6111)	LPH: Landing Transport Helicopter	14,550/19,000	2007	2	-	-
Cheon Wang Bong class	Christening ceremony of ROKS Cheonwangbong (Cheonwangbong class)	LST: Landing Ship Tank	4,900/8,000	2014	4	-	LST-II
Go Jun Bong class	ROKS Birobong (Gojunbong class)	LST: Landing Ship Tank	2,900/4,900	1993	4	-	-
Solgae 631 class	ROKS Solgae 632 (Solgae 631 class)	LSF: Landing Ship Fast	95/155	2007	4	2	LSF-II (locally-built LCAC)
Solgae 621 class	ROKS Solgae 623 (Solgae 621 class)	LSF: Landing Ship Fast	132/149	2005	3	-	Assault hovercraft (Project 12061E Murena-E) transferred from Russia
Mine warfare ships
Nampo class		MLS: Mine Layer Ship	3,000/4,240	2017	1	-	MLS-II
Wonsan class	ROKS Wonsan (Wonsan class)	MLS: Mine Layer Ship	2,500/3,300	1997	1	-	MLS-I
Yangyang class	ROKS Ongjin (Yangyang class) and ROKS Goryeong (Ganggyeong class) on background	MSH: Mine Sweeper Hunter	730/880	1999	6		-
Ganggyeong class	ROKS Ongjin (Yangyang class) and ROKS Goryeong (Ganggyeong class) on background	MHC: Mine Hunter Coastal	470/520	1986	6	-	-
Auxiliary ships
Hansando class	-	ATH: Training Ship Helicopter	4,500/6,000	2020	1	-	Training ship and Casualty Receiving & Treatment Ships (CRTS)
Soyang class	Republic of Korea Navy Fast Combat Support Ship "Soyang"(AOE-51) berthed at Busan Naval Base in Jan 2020.	AOE: Fast Combat Support Ship	10,600/23,000	2018	1	-	AOE-II
Cheonji class	ROKS Hwacheon (AOE 59) in counter-terror exercise	AOE: Fast Combat Support Ship	4,200/9,200	1991	3	-	-
Tongyeong class	Christening ceremony of ROKS Tongyeong (Tongyeong class)	ATS: Salvage and Rescue Ship	3,500/4,710	2014	2	-	ATS-II
Ganghwado class	-	ASR: Submarine Rescue Ship	5,600/6,800	2023	1	-	ASR-II
Cheonghaejin class	ROKS Cheonghaejin (Cheonghaejin class)	ASR: Submarine Rescue Ship	3,200/4,300	1996	1	-	To be followed by ASR-II
Singiwon class	-	AGS: Surveying Ship	3,500/4,600	2014	1	-	AGX-II
Sinsegi class	-	AGS: Surveying Ship	2,850/3,700	2003	1	-	AGX-I
Mulgae (LCU 87) class	-	LCU: Landing Craft Utility	540/940	2010	3	-	500-ton LCU for logistics support
Mulgae (LCU/L 79) class	-	LCU/L: Landing Craft Utility Minelayer	235/442	1998	7	-	Littoral transport, logistics and mine warfare support

=== Aircraft ===
The Air Wing Six operates about 70 fixed-wing and rotary-wing aircraft including P-3CK Orion maritime patrol aircraft and AW159 Wildcat ASW helicopters. These aircraft operate from bases throughout South Korea, as well as from the ROK Navy's ships.

The ROK Navy had operated about 30 S-2 anti-submarine warfare aircraft from 1976 to 2001. From 1977 to 1979, the Navy had acquired 12 Aérospatiale Alouette III helicopters for shipboard helicopter operations with ex-USN Gearing-class destroyers. The ROK Navy had acquired eight P-3C aircraft by 1996, and eight more P-3CK maritime patrol aircraft (ex-USN P-3B) were delivered to the ROK Navy by 2010 after undergoing extensive refurbishment and modernization. The Navy took delivery of the first batch of 12 Mk.99 Lynx helicopters in 1991; a second batch of 13 Mk.99A Super Lynx helicopters began delivery in 1999. In 2016, the Navy took delivery of eight AW159 Wildcats helicopters. Six P-8 Poseidon maritime patrol aircraft were acquired in 2024.

Aircraft	Image	Type	Variant	First deployment	In service	Note
Fixed-wing aircraft
Boeing P-8 Poseidon		ASW/Maritime patrol aircraft	P-8A	2023	6	
Lockheed P-3 Orion	A ROKN P-3 Orion taking part in searching for Indonesia AirAsia Flight 8501	ASW/Maritime patrol aircraft	P-3CK	2010	7	8 ex-USN P-3B sent from AMARC for modernization by KAI; 1 additional spare aircraft used for parts and eventually the remaining hull was scrapped in Tucson, Arizona. 1 lost May 2025.
Lockheed P-3 Orion	A ROKN P-3 Orion taking part in searching for Indonesia AirAsia Flight 8501	ASW/Maritime patrol aircraft	P-3C	1995	8	Updated
Reims-Cessna F406 Caravan II	A French Reims F406	light utility aircraft	F406	1999	5	Target tug
Rotary-wing aircraft
AgustaWestland AW159 Wildcat	A Royal Navy Wildcat	ASW helicopter	AW159	2017	8	
Sikorsky SH-60 Seahawk		ASW helicopter	MH-60R	2026	2	10 on order
Sikorsky UH-60 Black Hawk	A ROKN UH-60P supporting SSU training	utility transport helicopter	UH-60P	1994	8	Built by KAL-ASD
Westland Lynx	A ROKN Lynx ASW helo	ASW helicopter	Super Lynx Mk.99A	1999	12	
Westland Lynx	A ROKN Lynx ASW helo	ASW helicopter	Lynx Mk.99	1991	11	

=== Weaponry ===
The ROK Navy, the Defense Acquisition Program Administration (DAPA), and the Agency for Defense Development (ADD) have been developing naval weaponry with local defense companies.

== Future acquisitions ==
=== Ships ===
- Korean Submarine (KSS)

The KSS program was a three-phased program to build up the ROK Navy's submarine forces. Before the KSS program, the submarine fleet of the ROK Navy consisted of Dolgorae-class midget submarines, which had limited capabilities for inshore operations.

Through the first phase, KSS-I, the ROK Navy acquired nine 1,200-ton Chang Bogo-class submarine. For the second phase, KSS-II, the ROK Navy planned to acquire nine 1,800-ton Sohn Wonyil-class submarines with Air-Independent propulsion (AIP) system; the lead boat of her class, ROKS Sohn Wonyil (SS 072) was launched at a shipyard of Hyundai Heavy Industries on June 9, 2006. The Type 214 submarine is expected to play a key role in safeguarding the country's maritime interests. For the third phase of the program, the lead boat of KSS-III, the Dosan Ahn Changho (SS 083) was launched in 2018. A total of nine 3,000-ton KSS-III submarines are expected to be built in South Korea with indigenous technologies (i.e. not going under license as the previous KSS-I and KSS-II submarines).

The KSS-III submarines will be able to fire submarine launched ballistic missiles (SLBMs): Prompted by North Korea's development of the Pukguksong-1 (KN-11) SLBM, a vertical launching pad will be installed on the submarines for a missile expected to be developed by 2020. KSS-III submarines will have six vertical missile launch tubes that could house Hyunmoo-2B short-range ballistic missile with a range of 500 km (310 mi).

South Korea has long sought the acquisition of nuclear-powered submarines, and the 2021 AUKUS announcement to supply Australia with US made Virginia class submarines together with nuclear propulsion technology to Australia so they can build a new submarine class SSN-AUKUS in Australia has renewed this desire.

On 13 November 2025, a Joint Fact Sheet was released following a meeting between US president Donald Trump and South Korean president Lee Jae Myung on 29 October in South Korea. The fact sheet said that the US has given South Korea approval to build nuclear-powered submarines and will assist them with "...avenues to source fuel." The New York Times reported that during the meeting Lee sought US approval to build the nuclear-powered submarines in South Korea and asked for assistance to source fuel. Prior to the release of the fact sheet on 30 October, Trump posted on Truth Social that the nuclear-powered submarines would be built at the South Korean owned Hanwha Philly Shipyard in the US. In response to the post, the South Korean Prime Minister Kim Min-seok said that the Hanwha Philly Shipyard did not currently have the capability to build a nuclear-powered submarine. South Korean national security adviser Wi Sung-lac said that "All our talks were based on the precondition that South Korea will build its nuclear-powered submarines in South Korea."

The "Chang Bogo N Project" to acquire nuclear submarines was formally announced on 26 March 2026. The submarine will not carry nuclear weapons and is intended as a response to the expansion of the North Korean missile submarine fleet. The boats will be built entirely within South Korea, with the first boat to be launched by the mid-2030s and operational by 2040.

- Aircraft Carrier Experimental (CVX)

The ROK Navy initially planned to build an amphibious assault ships capable of operating the F-35B as the LPX-II program. In August 2020, the Ministry of National Defense formally announced its intent to begin construction of a 30,000-ton light aircraft carrier, and it was authorized as the CVX program in February 2021. The ROK Navy plans to acquire an aircraft carrier by 2033.

- Korea Destroyer Experimental (KDX)

The KDX program was a three-phased program to modernize the surface fleet by developing and constructing new destroyers for the ROK Navy with advanced combat systems and weaponry. The outcomes of this program include the Kwanggaeto the Great-class destroyer destroyers, which are the first ROK destroyers to be armed with surface-to-air missiles; the Chungmugong Yi Sunshin-class destroyers; and the powerful Sejong the Great-class destroyer, which are equipped with the sophisticated AEGIS combat system for air-defense and anti-missile operations. These new destroyers replaced antiquated destroyers that had been transferred from the U.S. Navy decades ago.

As follow up programs, the ROK Navy plans to build six 8,000-ton destroyers (KDDX) by 2030 as successors of the Chungmugong Yi Sunshin-class destroyers.

- Frigate Experimental (FFX)

These frigates will be armed with the American-made Phalanx CIWS system and the rolling airframe missile system, and they will each carry an anti-submarine warfare helicopter.

- Patrol Killer Experimental (PKX)

Through the PKX program, the ROK Navy plans to build a fleet of a next generation patrol craft with Cooperative Engagement Capability and enhanced weaponry such as 76 mm guns and the KSSM anti-ship missiles. There are two variations: PKX-A and PKX-B. The PKX-A is a 570-ton patrol craft with anti-ship missiles; PKX-B is a 200-ton patrol craft. 18 PKX-As and 34 PKX-Bs are planned.

On 28 June 2007, the lead ship of PKX-A, PKG 711 named, ROKS Yoon Youngha, captain of PKM 357 at the Second Battle of Yeonpyeong was launched at the shipyard of Hanjin Heavy Industries in Busan. All 18 PKGs were commissioned by 2018 to replace the aging Chamsuri-class patrol craft. The lead ship of PKX-B, ROKS Chamsuri 211 (PKMR 211), was commissioned in 2017.

- Landing Transport Experimental (LPX)

The LPX program was the ROK Navy's new amphibious warfare ship program for which Hanjin Heavy Industries has provided the general design package. The ROK Navy's requirements for the new amphibious warfare ships were to enhance Korea's current amphibious operation capability, both in terms of assault and military operations other than war (MOOTW) type operations.

On 12 July 2005, the lead ship (LPH 6111) of the 14,500-ton Dokdo-class amphibious transport dock was launched at the shipyard of Hanjin Heavy Industries in Busan. The first air-cushion landing craft of LSF-II (ROKS Solgae 631) was delivered for ROKS Dokdo in April 2007. In October 2009, the ROK Navy revealed a plan to commission another LPX around 2018. The Marado (LPH 6112) was launched in May 2018.

- MSH phase II

The ROKN plans to build and commission three more Yangyang class mine warfare ships. The lead ship, Namhae was launched in April 2020.

- ASR-II

The ROK Navy plans to commission a new submarine rescue ship around 2022. Daewoo S&ME (DSME) will build the ship, and UK-based underwater systems developer JFD will deliver a deep-submergence rescue vehicle (DSRV) for the ROK Navy in 2021.

=== Aircraft ===
- Maritime Patrol Aircraft-II

The ROK Navy had acquired eight P-3C aircraft by 1996 through the Maritime Patrol Aircraft-I phase I. Through the phase II, eight more P-3CK maritime patrol aircraft, modified from retired USN P-3B had been delivered to the ROK Navy by 2010 after undergoing extensive refurbishment and modernization.

In May 2013, it was announced that the Defense Acquisition Program Administration (DAPA) was commencing a ₩1 trillion (equivalent to ₩1.25 trillion or US$935.39 million in 2025) procurement program to acquire up to 20 new anti-submarine warfare aircraft to replace the existing fleet of 16 P-3Cs. While possible candidates include the C-295 MPA, P-8 Poseidon and the SC-130J Sea Hercules, DAPA was considering a plan to procure 12 to 20 ex-USN S-3 Vikings for the ROKN. In 2017, the ROK Navy canceled plans to purchase refurbished and upgraded S-3 Viking aircraft. In March 2019, the South Korean government ordered six P-8A aircraft from Boeing.

- Maritime Helicopter-II

Through Maritime Helicopter-I, the ROK Navy took delivery of the first batch of 12 Mk.99 Lynx helicopters in 1991; a second batch of 13 Mk.99A Super Lynx helicopters began delivery in 1999. The first Lynx batch was later upgraded to the same standard as the second batch; the changes included the adoption of a new radar, FLIR, and ESM systems.

On 15 January 2013, the Defense Acquisition Program Administration announced the selection of the AW159 Wildcat to fulfill a requirement of the ROK Navy for a maritime helicopter, winning out against the MH-60R Seahawk. The batch of eight aircraft were chosen to perform search-and-rescue missions, anti-submarine warfare and surveillance. On 13 June 2016, the Navy took delivery of four Wildcats. The helicopters operate from the Navy's Incheon-class guided missile/coastal defense frigates. The remaining four were delivered in late November 2016.

In December 2020, the South Korean government ordered 12 MH-60 Seahawk helicopters to further strengthen the Navy's anti-submarine capabilities.

- Mine Countermeasure Helicopter

The ROK Navy had planned to acquire new mine countermeasure helicopters by 2012 with a budget of 480 billion won. AgustaWestland EH-101, NHIndustries NH-90, and Sikorsky MH-60S were considered as possible candidates for the acquisition program before it delayed the program due to the 2008 financial crisis.

- Basic Training Helicopter

On 17 May 2022, Defense Acquisition Program Administration orders 40 Bell 505 helicopters cost of 170 billion won (US$133.75 million). It will be used as basic training, delivery will start from 2025. These helicopters will be used by both ROK Navy and ROK Army.

== See also ==
- Chief of Naval Operations (South Korea)
- Korean People's Navy
- Republic of Korea Coast Guard

== Explanatory notes ==
Romanization is according to Revised Romanization of Korean (adopted in 2000), with exceptions of personal names. Names of ships commissioned before 2000 might have been romanized according to McCune–Reischauer. Examples of changes (M-R → RR): Chinhae → Jinhae; Inchon → Incheon; Kangnung → Gangneung; Kimpo → Gimpo; Pusan → Busan; Taegu → Daegu.
