= Nampo-class minelayer =

Ship class

Class overview
- Name: Nampo class
- Builders: Hyundai Heavy Industries
- Operators: Republic of Korea Navy
- Preceded by: Wonsan class
- In commission: 2017–present
- Completed: 1
- Active: 1

General characteristics
- Type: Minelayer
- Displacement: 3,000 t (empty), 4,240 t (full load)
- Length: 114 m (374 ft 0 in)
- Beam: 17 m (55 ft 9 in)
- Height: 28 m (91 ft 10 in)
- Speed: 23 knots (43 km/h; 26 mph) (max)
- Complement: 120
- Sensors & processing systems: LIG Nex1 SQS-240K hull-mounted sonar; STX SPS-300K 2D Marine radar; LIG Nex1 SPG-540K fire control radar; LIG Nex1 SPS-550K air search 3D radar
- Electronic warfare & decoys: LIG Nex1 SLQ-200K Sonata electronic warfare suite; LIG Nex1 SLQ-261K torpedo acoustic counter measures; Rheinmetall MASS decoy launchers
- Armament: 1 × OTO Melara 76 mm/L62 caliber naval gun; 2 × Mark 46 torpedo in triple torpedo tubes or K745 Blue Shark lightweight torpedo; 16-cell K-VLS for: K-SAAM quadpacked in 4 per cell

Nampo-class minelayer (Korean: 남포급 기뢰부설함; Hanja: 南浦級機雷敷設艦) or MLS-II (Mine Laying Ship-II) is a new class of anti-submarine warfare minelayers built by Hyundai Heavy Industries for the Republic of Korea Navy.

== Features ==
The MLS-II Nampo has a length of 114 meters (374 ft 0 in), 17 m (55 ft 9 in) in width and 28 m (91 ft 10 in) in draft with a displacement of 4,000 tons. Its crew complement is 120. The ships are equipped with a K-VLS package on top of the helicopter hangar that can deploy K-SAAM surface-to-air missiles. The Nampo class are also fitted with two Mark 32 Surface Vessel Torpedo Tubes for LIG Nex1 K745 Blue Shark anti-submarine torpedoes. Each ship is protected by two Rheinmetall Multi Ammunition Softkill Systems (MASS) which are installed amidships. The Nampo class is also equipped with two LIG Nex1 SLQ-261K Torpedo Acoustic Counter Measure (TACM) systems. The main radar of the ships is a LIG Nex1 SPS-550K medium to long-range air and surface surveillance multibeam 3D radar.

== Ships in the class ==
Hull no.	Name	Launched	Commissioned	Status
MLS-570	Nampo	2015	2017	Active
