= Wonsan-class minelayer =

Ship class

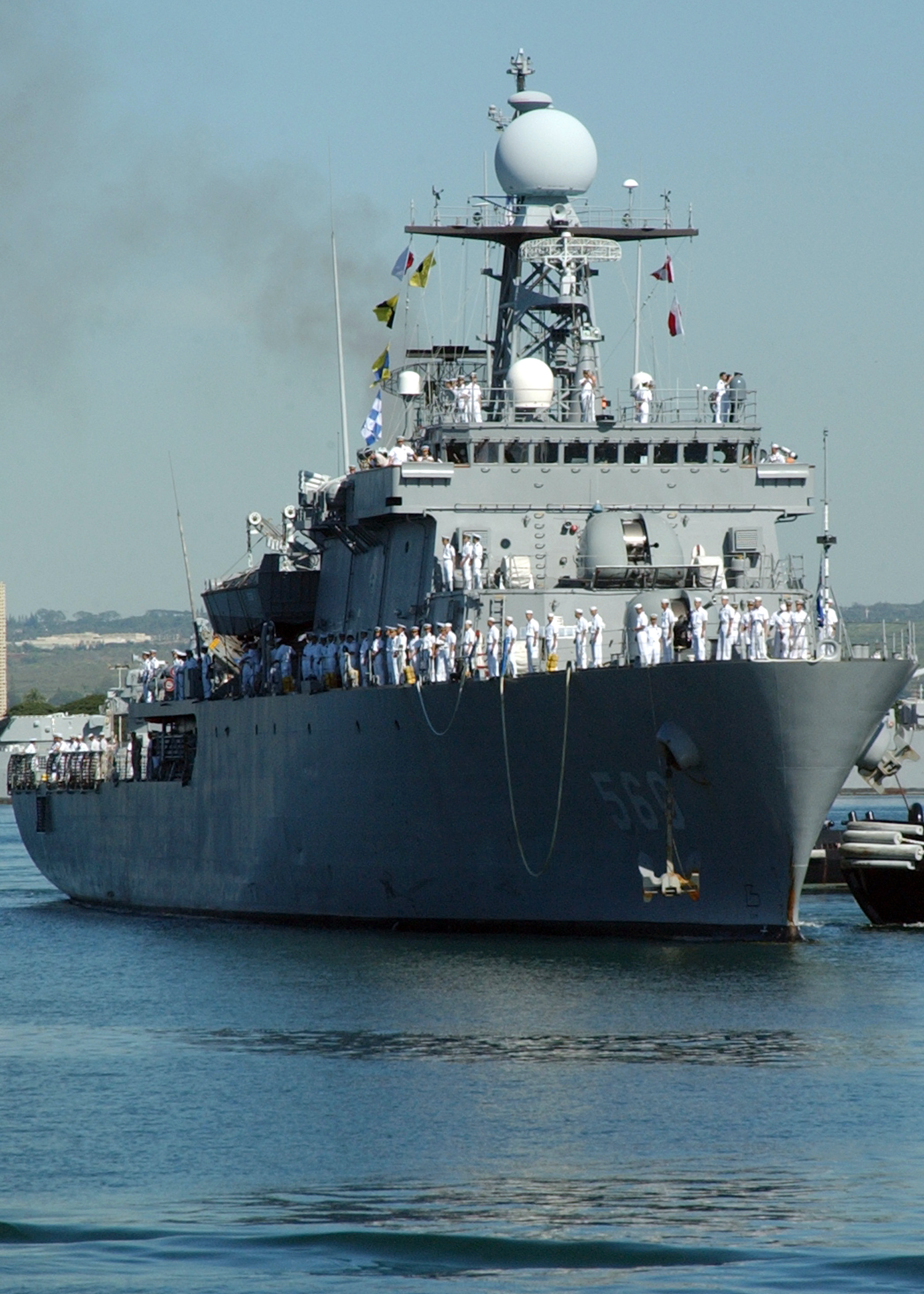
- ROKS Wonsan

Class overview
- Name: Nampo class
- Builders: Hyundai Heavy Industries
- Operators: Republic of Korea Navy
- Succeeded by: Nampo-class minelayer
- In commission: 1998–present
- Planned: 3
- Completed: 1

General characteristics
- Type: Minelayer
- Displacement: 3,300 tonnes (3,248 long tons) full load
- Length: 104 m (341 ft 2 in)
- Beam: 15 m (49 ft 3 in)
- Draft: 4 m (13 ft 1 in)
- Propulsion: Combined diesel and diesel 4 SEMT-Pielstick 12 PA 6 diesels
- Speed: 22 knots (41 km/h; 25 mph)
- Range: 4,500 nmi (8,300 km) at 15 kn (28 km/h)
- Complement: 160
- Sensors & processing systems: Signaal DA-08 air surveillance radar; AN/SPS-10C navigation radar; ST-1802 fire control radar; Signaal PHS-32 hull-mounted sonar
- Electronic warfare & decoys: ULQ-11K ESM/ECM suite
- Armament: 1 × OTO Melara 76 mm/L62 caliber naval gun; 2 × 40L70K double-barreled 40 mm cannon; 2 × triple 324 mm (12.8 in) Mark 32 torpedo tubes; 500 mines

Wonsan-class minelayer (Korean: 원산급 기뢰부설함; Hanja: 元山級機雷敷設艦) or MLS-I (Mine Laying Ship-I) is a one-ship class of minelayers currently in service on the Republic of Korea Navy.

The Republic of Korea Navy planned to commission three Wonsan class mine layers. However, due to budget problems, only one was commissioned.

== Ships in the class ==
Hull no.	Name	Launched	Commissioned	Status
MLS-560	Wonsan	1994	1998	Active

== See also ==
- Republic of Korea Navy
