= List of active Republic of Korea Navy ships =

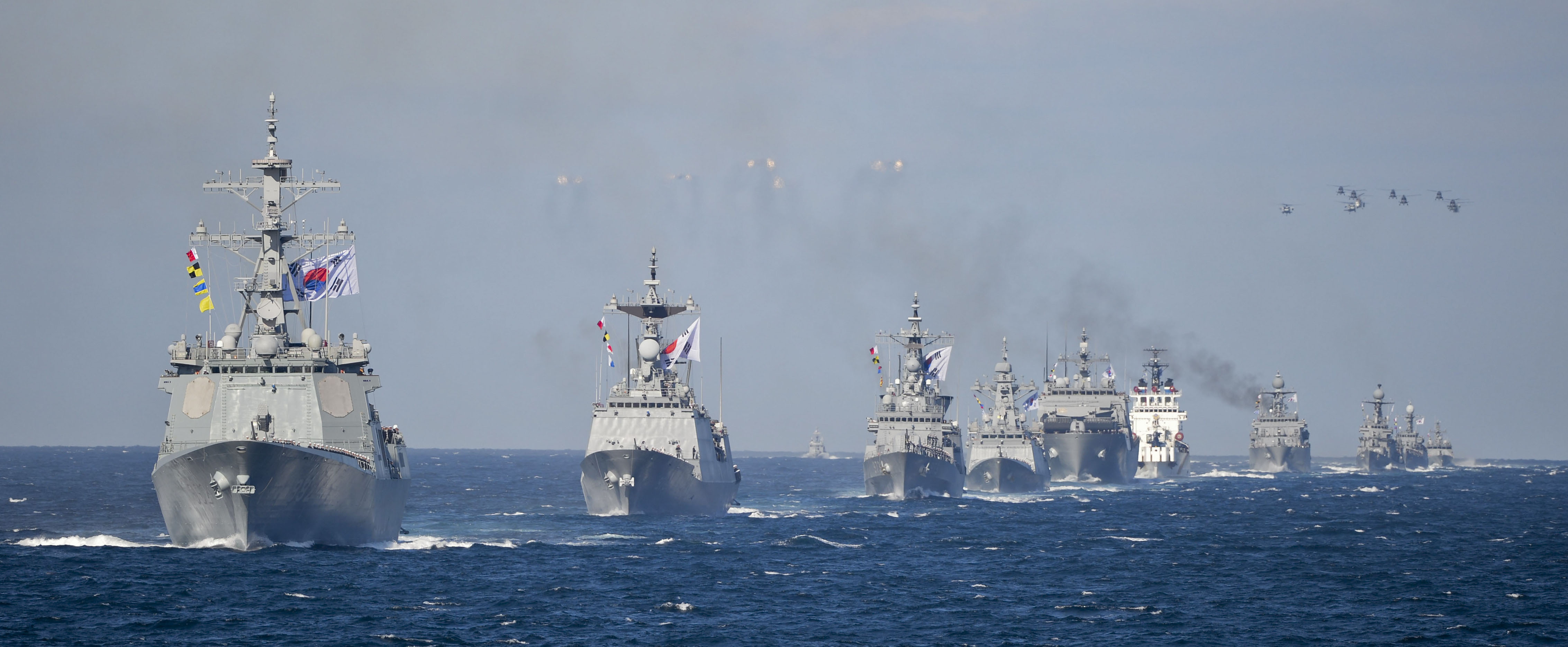
South Korean navy ships sail in formation for the Fleet Review 2015.

Naval ensign of South Korea

Naval jack of South Korea

The Republic of Korea Navy has about 160 ships in commission (a total displacement of about 232,285 tonnes).

The vessels are categorized into four levels. A first-rate ship (Sohn Wonyil-class SS, DDG, DDH, LPH, MLS, and AOE) is commanded by a captain; a second-rate ship (SS, FFG, FF, PCC, LST, ATS, and ASR) by a commander; a third-rate ship (PKG, MSH, and MHC) by a lieutenant commander; and a fourth-rate craft (PKMR, PKM, and LSF) is commanded by a lieutenant or a warrant officer.

The ROK Navy employs the U.S. Navy-style letter based hull classification symbols to designate the types of its ships and hull numbers to uniquely identify its vessels (e.g. DDH 975). The names are that of the historical figures, provinces, cities, counties, peaks, lakes, islands, and birds. The Chief of Naval Operations selects the names of ships.

The ship prefix for all the commissioned ROK Navy ship is ROKS (Republic of Korea Ship) when the names of ships are written in English.

== Submarine fleet ==
Submarines (SS) are named after historical figures. The Navy currently operates 21 submarines.

=== Attack submarines with ballistic missile launching capabilities ===
Class	ROKN classification	Hull number	Name	Hangul name (Hanja)	Displacement (submerged, tons)	Launch date	Delivery date	Commission date	Builder	Note
Active (3)
Dosan Ahn Changho class	SS: Submarine	083	Dosan Ahn Changho	도산 안창호 (島山 安昌浩)	3,750	2018-09-14	2021-08-13	2021-08-13	Daewoo S&ME	Lead boat of KSS-III Batch-I;
Dosan Ahn Changho class	SS: Submarine	085	Ahn Mu	안무 (安武)	3,750	2020-11-10	2023-04-20	2023-04-26	Daewoo S&ME	-
Dosan Ahn Changho class	SS: Submarine	086	Shin Chae-ho	신채호 (申采浩)	3,750	2021-09-28	2024-04-04	2024-04-05	Hyundai Heavy Industries	Commissioned

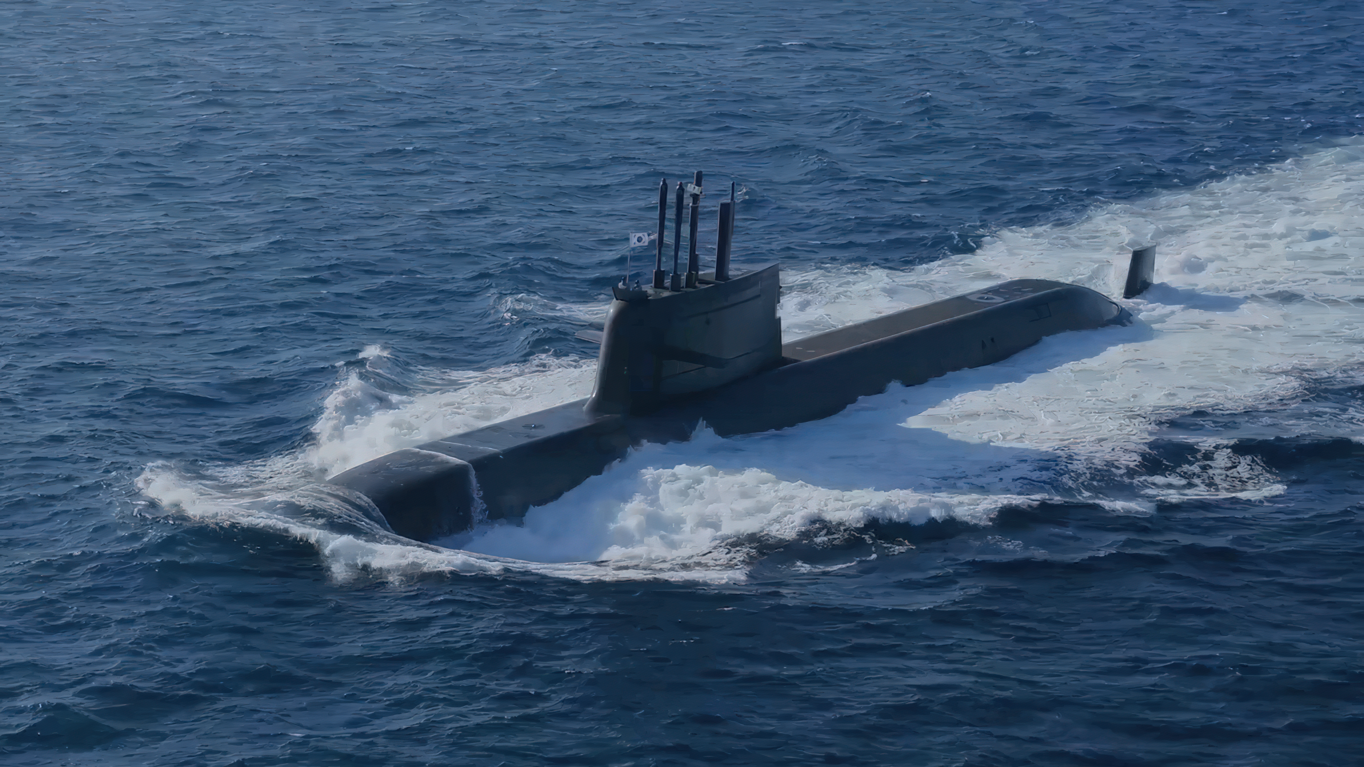
ROKS Dosan Ahn Changho (Dosan Ahn Changho class)

=== Attack submarines ===
Class	ROKN classification	Hull number	Name	Hangul name (Hanja)	Displacement (submerged, tons)	Launch date	Delivery date	Commission date	Builder	Note
Active (18)
Sohn Wonyil class	SS: Submarine	072	Sohn Won-yil	손원일 (孫元一)	1,860	2006-06-09	2007-12-26	2007-12-28	Hyundai Heavy Industries	Lead boat of KSS-II Batch-I
Sohn Wonyil class	SS: Submarine	073	Jeong Ji	정지 (鄭地)	1,860	2007-06-13	2008-11-28	2008-12-02	Hyundai Heavy Industries	-
Sohn Wonyil class	SS: Submarine	075	An Jung-geun	안중근 (安重根)	1,860	2008-06-04	2009-11-30	2009-12-01	Hyundai Heavy Industries	-
Sohn Wonyil class	SS: Submarine	076	Kim Jwa-jin	김좌진 (金佐鎭)	1,860	2013-08-13	2014-12-30	2014-12-31	Daewoo S&ME	Lead boat of Batch-II (6 in batch)
Sohn Wonyil class	SS: Submarine	077	Yun Bong-gil	윤봉길 (尹奉吉)	1,860	2014-07-03	2016-06-17	2016-06-20	Hyundai Heavy Industries	-
Sohn Wonyil class	SS: Submarine	078	Yu Gwan-sun	유관순 (柳寬順)	1,860	2015-05-07	2017-07-10	2017-07-11	Daewoo S&ME	-
Sohn Wonyil class	SS: Submarine	079	Hong Beom-do	홍범도 (洪範圖)	1,860	2016-04-05	2018-01-19	2018-01-23	Hyundai Heavy Industries	-
Sohn Wonyil class	SS: Submarine	081	Lee Beom-seok	이범석 (李範奭)	1,860	2016-11-08	2019-05-09	2019-05-13	Daewoo S&ME	-
Sohn Wonyil class	SS: Submarine	082	Shin Dol-seok	신돌석 (申乭石)	1,860	2017-09-07	2019-12-17	2020-01-31	Hyundai Heavy Industries	-
Jang Bogo class	SS: Submarine	061	Jang Bogo	장보고 (張保皐)	1,290	1991-09-12	1992-10-14	1993-06-02	Howaldtswerke-Deutsche Werft	Lead boat of KSS-I Batch-I
Jang Bogo class	SS: Submarine	062	Yi Cheon	이천 (李阡)	1,290	1992-10-12	1994-04-30	1994-06-20	Daewoo S&ME	Assembled in S. Korea
Jang Bogo class	SS: Submarine	063	Choe Museon	최무선 (崔茂宣)	1,290	1993-08-07	1995-02-27	1995-02-28	Daewoo S&ME	Assembled in S. Korea; Upgraded
Jang Bogo class	SS: Submarine	065	Park Wi	박위 (朴葳)	1,290	1994-05-21	1995-08-30	1995-08-31	Daewoo S&ME	Lead boat of Batch-II
Jang Bogo class	SS: Submarine	066	Lee Jongmoo	이종무 (李從茂)	1,290	1995-05-17	1996-08-30	1996-08-31	Daewoo S&ME	-
Jang Bogo class	SS: Submarine	067	Jung Woon	정운 (鄭運)	1,290	1996-05-07	1997-08-29	1997-08-30	Daewoo S&ME	-
Jang Bogo class	SS: Submarine	068	Lee Sun-sin	이순신 (李純信)	1,290	1998-05-21	2000-01-31	2000-02-01	Daewoo S&ME	Lead boat of KSS-I Batch-III; Capable of launching UGM-84L Sub Harpoon missiles
Jang Bogo class	SS: Submarine	069	Na Dae-yong	나대용 (羅大用)	1,290	1999-06-09	2000-11-30	2000-12-01	Daewoo S&ME	Capable of launching UGM-84L Sub Harpoon missiles; Upgraded
Jang Bogo class	SS: Submarine	071	Yi Eokgi	이억기 (李億祺)	1,290	2000-05-24	2001-11-30	2001-12-01	Daewoo S&ME	Capable of launching UGM-84L Sub Harpoon missiles; Upgraded

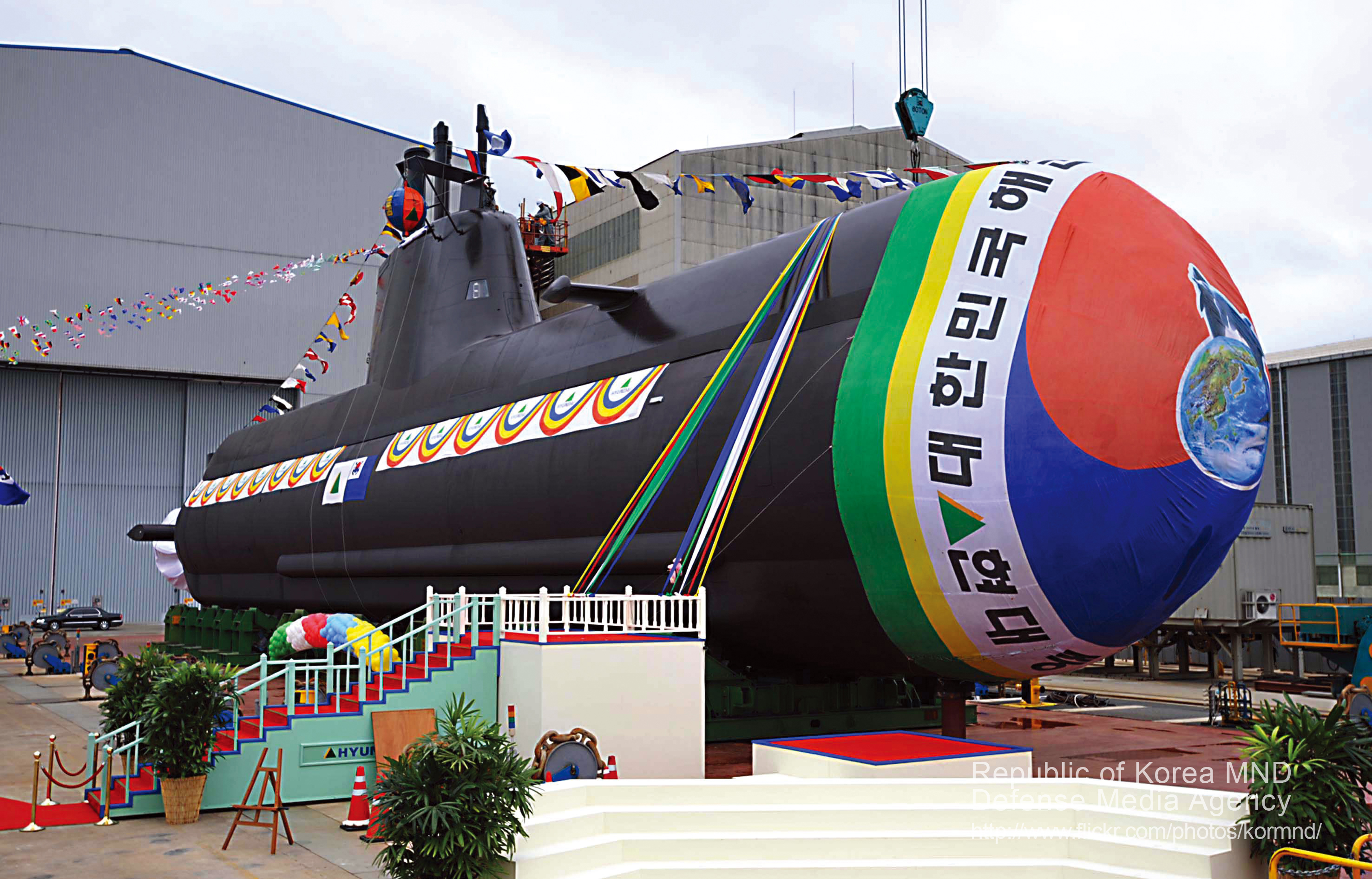
ROKS An Junggeun (Sohn Wonyil class)

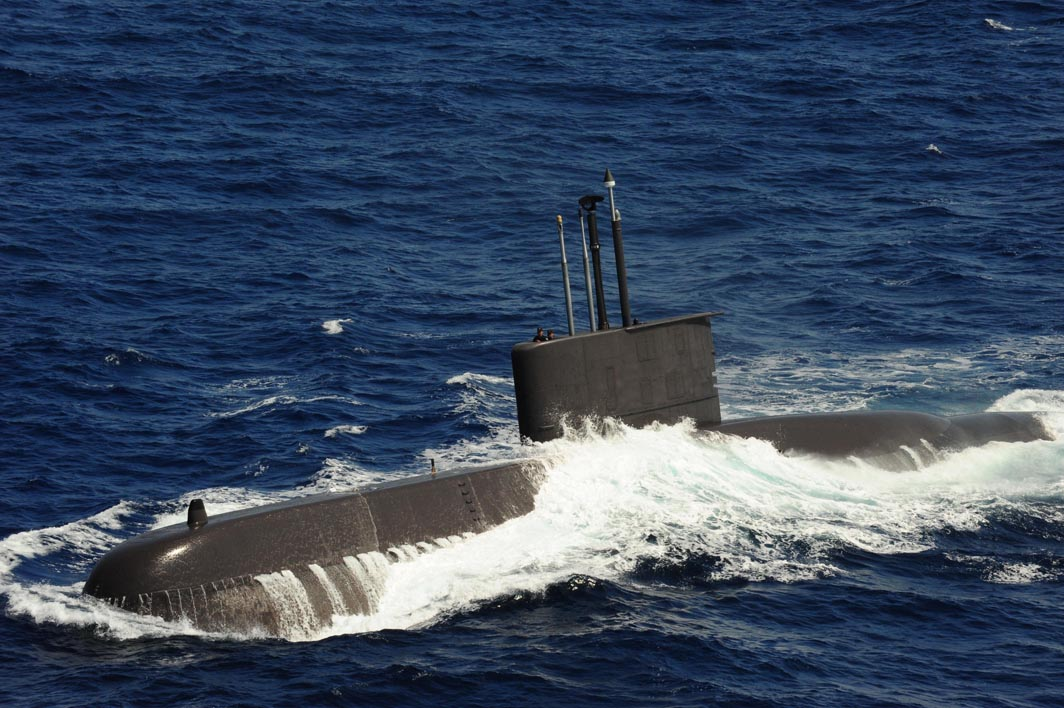
ROKS Lee Eokgi (Jang Bogo class)

== Surface fleet ==
=== Destroyers ===
Destroyers (DDG, DDH) are named after historical figures.

Class	ROKN classification	Hull number	Name	Hangul name (Hanja)	Displacement (light/full, tons)	Launch date	Delivery date	Commission date	Builder	Note
Active (10)
Sejong the Great class (KDX-III)	DDG: Destroyer Guided-missile	991	Sejong the Great	세종대왕 (世宗大王)	7,650/10,600	2007-05-25	2008-12-22	2008-12-22	Hyundai Heavy Industries	Lead ship of DDG Batch-I
Sejong the Great class (KDX-III)	DDG: Destroyer Guided-missile	992	Yulgok Yi I	율곡이이 (栗谷 李珥)	7,650/10,600	2008-11-14	2010-08-31	2010-09-01	Daewoo S&ME	-
Sejong the Great class (KDX-III)	DDG: Destroyer Guided-missile	993	Seoae Ryu Sungryong	서애류성룡 (西厓 柳成龍)	7,650/10,600	2011-03-24	2012-08-31	2012-09-03	Hyundai Heavy Industries	To be followed by Batch-II
Sejong the Great class (KDX-III)	DDG: Destroyer Guided-missile	995	Jeongjo the Great	정조대왕 (正祖大王)	8,200/12,000	2022-07-28	2024-11-27	2024-12-02	Hyundai Heavy Industries	Lead ship of DDG Batch-II
Sejong the Great class (KDX-III)	DDG: Destroyer Guided-missile	996	Dasan Jeong Yakyong	다산정약용 (茶山丁若鏞)	8,200/12,000	2025-09-17	2026-12-00	2026-12-00	Hyundai Heavy Industries	2nd ship of DDG Batch-II
Chungmugong Yi Sunshin class (KDX-II)	DDH: Destroyer Helicopter	975	Chungmugong Yi Sunshin	충무공이순신 (忠武公 李舜臣)	4,475/5,517	2002-05-22	2003-12-01	2003-12-02	Daewoo S&ME	-
Chungmugong Yi Sunshin class (KDX-II)	DDH: Destroyer Helicopter	976	Munmu the Great	문무대왕 (文武大王)	4,500/5,520	2003-04-11	2004-09-30	2004-10-04	Hyundai Heavy Industries	-
Chungmugong Yi Sunshin class (KDX-II)	DDH: Destroyer Helicopter	977	Dae Joyeong	대조영 (大祚榮)	4,500/5,520	2003-11-12	2005-06-30	2005-07-01	Daewoo S&ME	-
Chungmugong Yi Sunshin class (KDX-II)	DDH: Destroyer Helicopter	978	Wang Geon	왕건 (王建)	4,500/5,520	2005-05-04	2006-11-09	2006-11-10	Hyundai Heavy Industries	-
Chungmugong Yi Sunshin class (KDX-II)	DDH: Destroyer Helicopter	979	Kang Gam-chan	강감찬 (姜邯贊)	4,500/5,520	2006-03-16	2007-10-01	2007-10-02	Daewoo S&ME	-
Chungmugong Yi Sunshin class (KDX-II)	DDH: Destroyer Helicopter	981	Choi Young	최영 (崔瑩)	4,500/5,520	2006-10-20	2008-09-03	2008-09-04	Hyundai Heavy Industries	To be followed by KDDX
Kwanggaeto the Great class (KDX-I)	DDH: Destroyer Helicopter	971	Kwanggaeto the Great	광개토대왕 (廣開土大王)	3,200/3,900	1996-10-28	1998-07-24	1998-07-27	Daewoo S&ME	Lead ship of DDH-I
Kwanggaeto the Great class (KDX-I)	DDH: Destroyer Helicopter	972	Ulchi Moonduk	을지문덕 (乙支文德)	3,181/3,975	1997-10-16	1999-08-30	1999-09-01	Daewoo S&ME	-
Kwanggaeto the Great class (KDX-I)	DDH: Destroyer Helicopter	973	Yang Manchoon	양만춘 (楊萬春)	3,200/3,900	1998-10-19	2000-06-30	2000-07-01	Daewoo S&ME	-

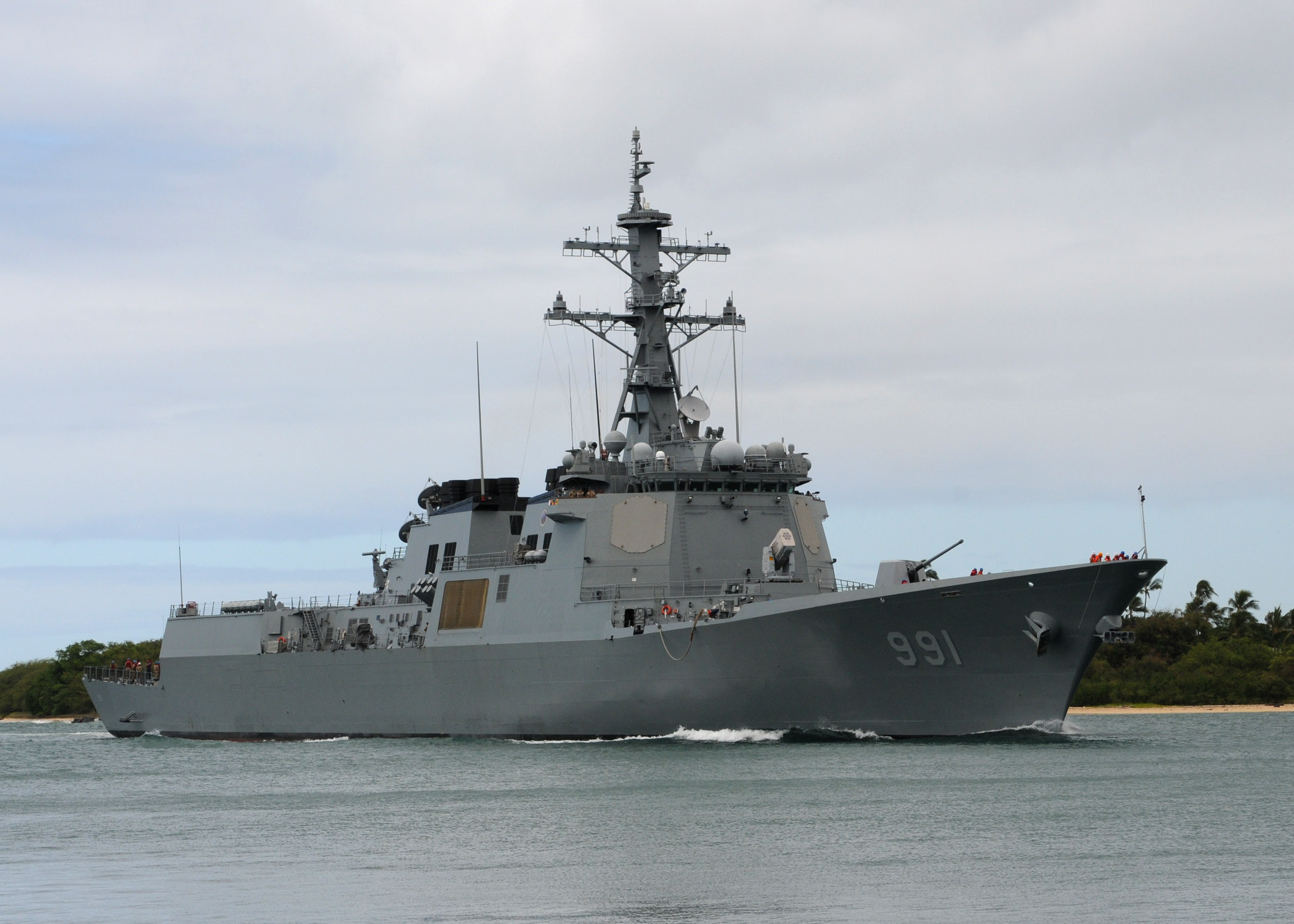
ROKS Sejong the Great (Sejong the Great class)

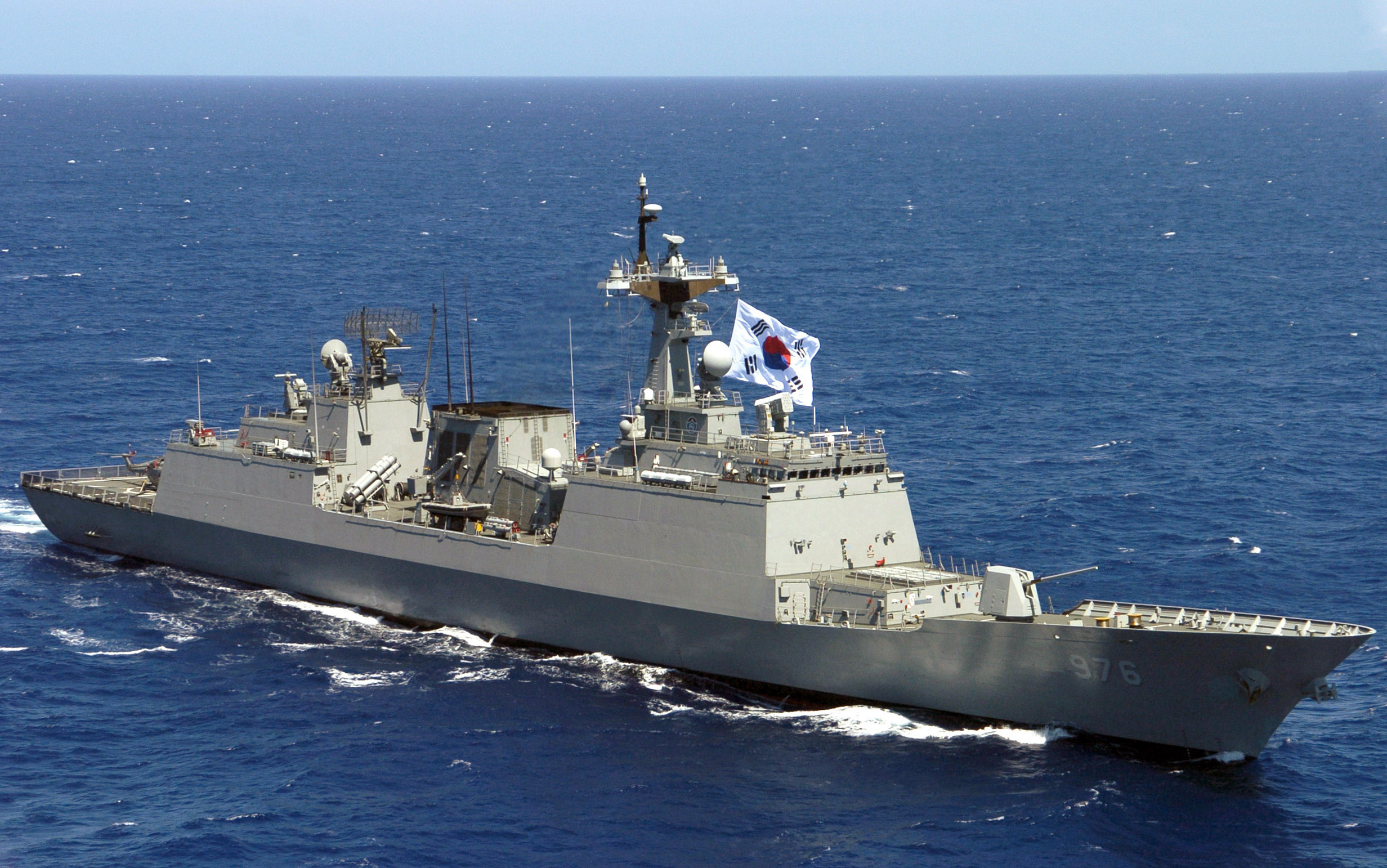
ROKS Munmu the Great (Chungmugong Yi Sunshin class)

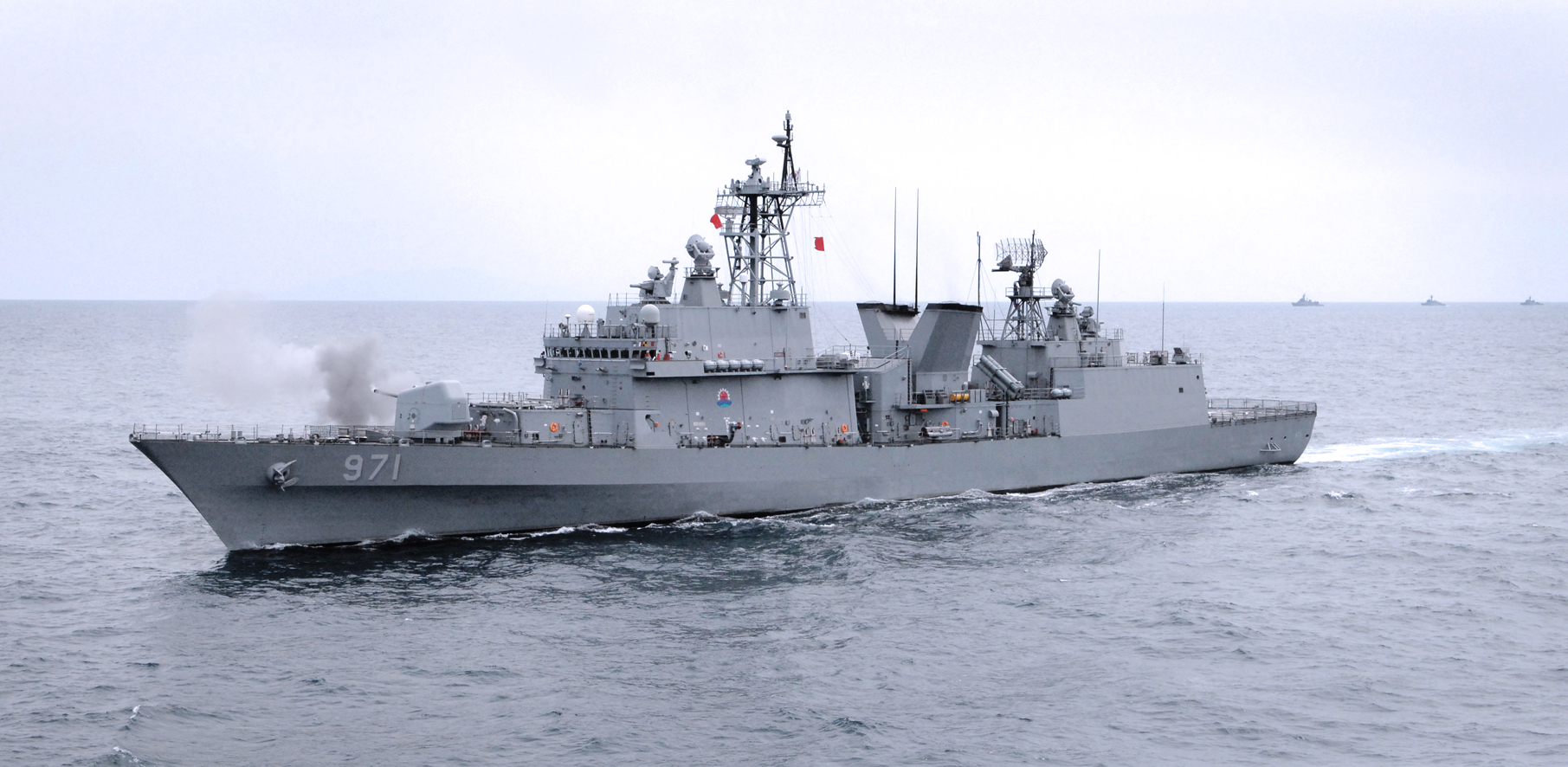
ROKS Gwanggaeto the Great (Kwanggaeto the Great class)

=== Frigates ===
Frigates (FFG, FF) are named after provinces and large cities that names previous ROK Navy destroyers had.

Class	ROKN classification	Hull number	Name	Hangul name (Hanja)	Displacement (light/full, tons)	Launch date	Delivery date	Commission date	Builder	Note
Active (18)
Chungnam class	FFG: Frigate Guided-missile	828	Chungnam	충남 (忠南)	3,600/4,300	2023-04-10	2024-12-18	2024-12-24	Hyundai Heavy Industries	Lead ship of FFG-III (FFX Batch-III; 6 in batch)
Chungnam class	FFG: Frigate Guided-missile	829	Gyeongbuk	경북 (慶北)	3,600/4,300	2025-06-20	2026-06-00	-	SK Oceanplant	3rd Gyeongbuk after FF-956
Daegu class (Note: Daegu class is the first South Korean warship to be fitted with DRS Hybrid Electric Drive system, coupled with Rolls-Royce MT-30 gas turbine engine for CODLAG integrated full-electric propulsion.)	FFG: Frigate Guided-missile	818	Daegu	대구 (大邱)	3,100/3,650	2016-06-02	2018-02-01	2018-03-06	Daewoo S&ME	Lead ship of FFG-II (FFX Batch-II; 8 in batch); 3rd Daegu after JMS 303, DD 97/917
Daegu class	FFG: Frigate Guided-missile	819	Gyeongnam	경남 (慶南)	3,100/3,650	2019-06-21	2020-12-31	2021-01-04	Daewoo S&ME	2nd Gyeongnam after APD 81/822
Daegu class	FFG: Frigate Guided-missile	821	Seoul	서울	3,100/3,650	2019-11-11	2021-07-13	2021–07	Hyundai Heavy Industries	Commissioned in 2021; 4th Seoul after LCI 101, DD 92/912, FF 952
Daegu class	FFG: Frigate Guided-missile	822	Donghae	동해 (東海)	3,100/3,650	2020-04-29	2021-11-03	2021-11-10	Hyundai Heavy Industries	Commissioned in 2021; 2nd Donghae after PCC 751.
Daegu class	FFG: Frigate Guided-missile	823	Daejeon	대전 (大田)	3,100/3,650	2021-05-03	2023-02-19	2023-02-27	Daewoo S&ME	Commissioned in 2023, 3rd Daejeon after JMS 301, DD 99/919
Daegu class	FFG: Frigate Guided-missile	825	Pohang	포항 (浦項)	3,100/3,650	2021-09-08	2023-02-28	2023-03-06	Daewoo S&ME	Commissioned in 2023
Daegu class	FFG: Frigate Guided-missile	826	Cheonan	천안 (天安)	3,100/3,650	2021-11-09	2023-05-15	2023-05-19	Hyundai Heavy Industries	Commissioned in 2023
Daegu class	FFG: Frigate Guided-missile	827	Chuncheon	춘천 (春川)	3,100/3,650	2022-03-22	2023-10-24	2023-10-26	Hyundai Heavy Industries	Commissioned in 2023
Incheon class	FFG: Frigate Guided-missile	811	Incheon	인천 (仁川)	2,500/3,251	2011-04-29	2013-01-15	2013-01-17	Hyundai Heavy Industries	Lead ship of FFG-I (FFX Batch-I; 6 in batch); 3rd Incheon after AKL 902, DD 98/918
Incheon class	FFG: Frigate Guided-missile	812	Gyeonggi	경기 (京畿)	2,500/3,251	2013-07-18	2014-10-31	2014-11-03	Hyundai Heavy Industries	3rd Gyeonggi after DE 71, DD 923
Incheon class	FFG: Frigate Guided-missile	813	Jeonbuk	전북 (全北)	2,500/3,251	2013-11-13	2014-12-31	2015-01-05	Hyundai Heavy Industries	2nd Jeonbuk after DD 96/916
Incheon class	FFG: Frigate Guided-missile	815	Gangwon	강원 (江原)	2,500/3,251	2014-08-12	2015-12-31	2016-01-06	STX Offshore & Shipbuilding	3rd Gangwon after DE 72, DD 922
Incheon class	FFG: Frigate Guided-missile	816	Chungbuk	충북 (忠北)	2,500/3,251	2014-10-23	2016-01-20	2016-01-26	STX Offshore & Shipbuilding	2nd Chungbuk after DD 95/915
Incheon class	FFG: Frigate Guided-missile	817	Gwangju	광주 (光州)	2,500/3,251	2015-08-11	2016-11-09	2016-11-10	STX Offshore & Shipbuilding	3rd Gwangju after YMS 503, DD 90/921
Ulsan class (Note: Being phased out, to be replaced by Incheon and Daegu-class frigates (3 removed from service.).)	FF: Frigate	959	Busan	부산 (釜山)	1,446/2,350	1992-02-20	1992-10-30	1992-11-02	Hyundai Heavy Industries	3rd Busan after AKL 901, DD 93/913
Ulsan class	FF: Frigate	961	Cheongju	청주 (淸州)	1,446/2,350	1992-03-20	1992-11-30	-	Daewoo S&ME	2nd Cheongju after LCI 104

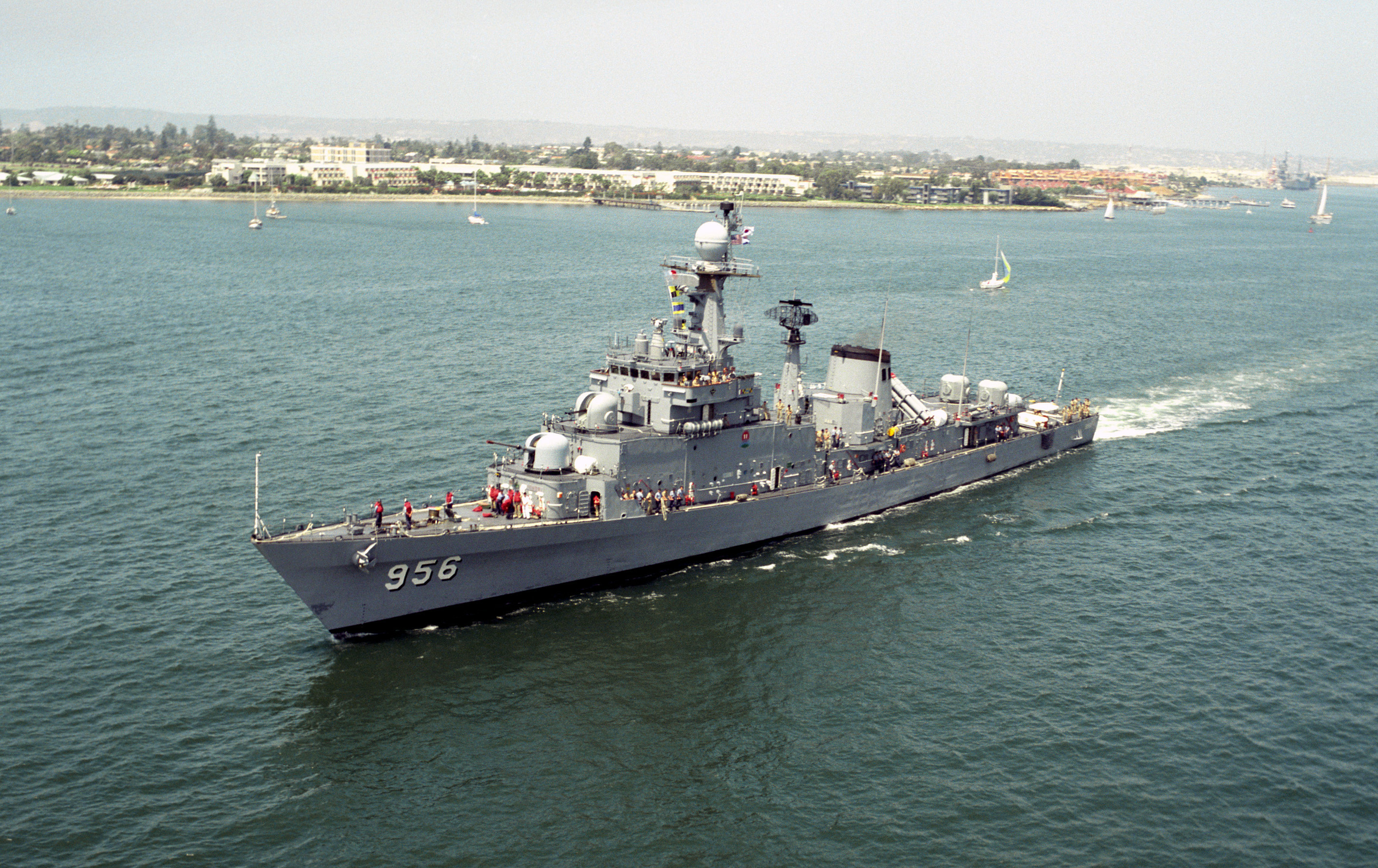
ROKS Gyeongbuk (Ulsan class)

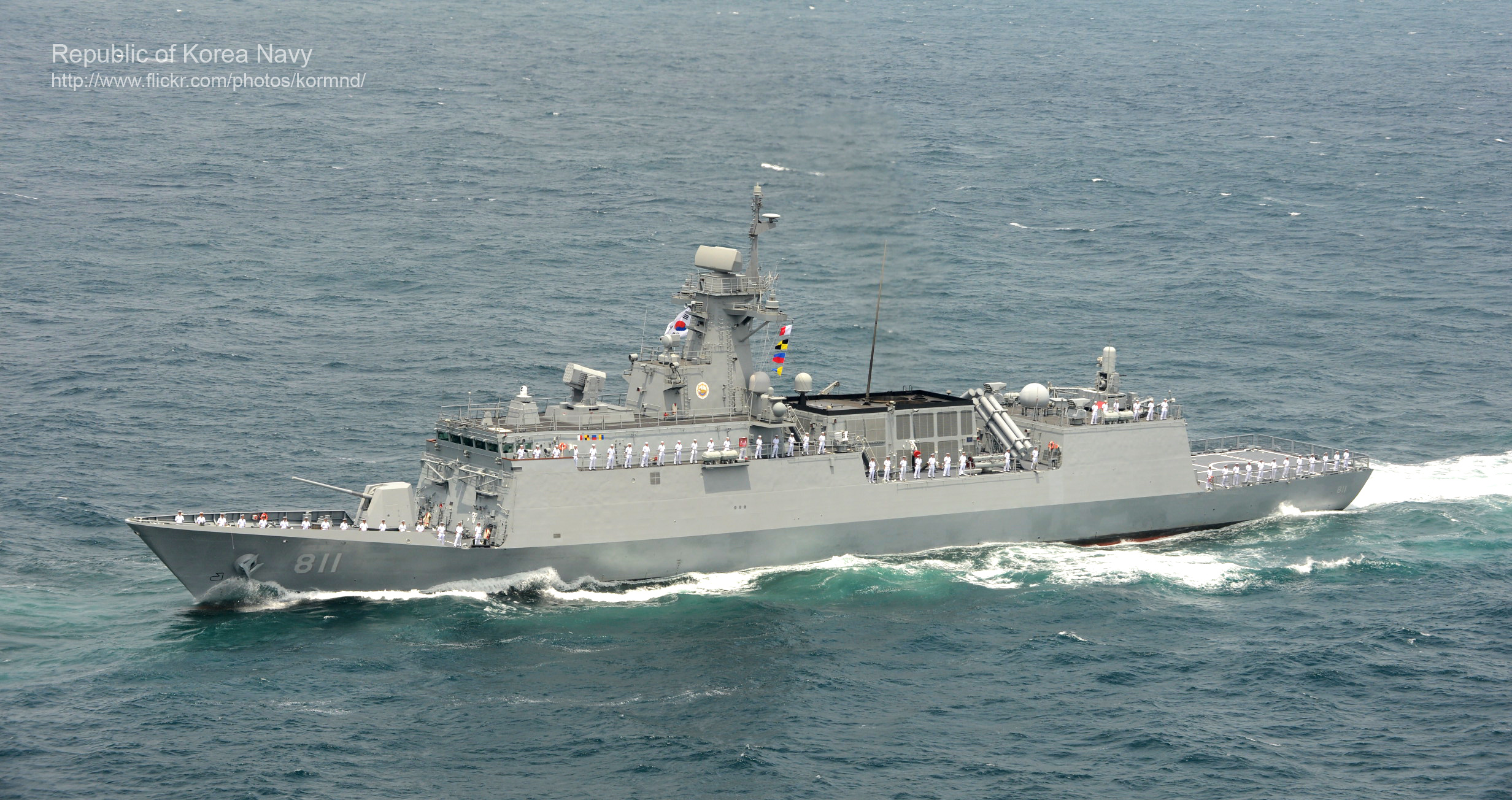
ROKS Incheon (Incheon class)

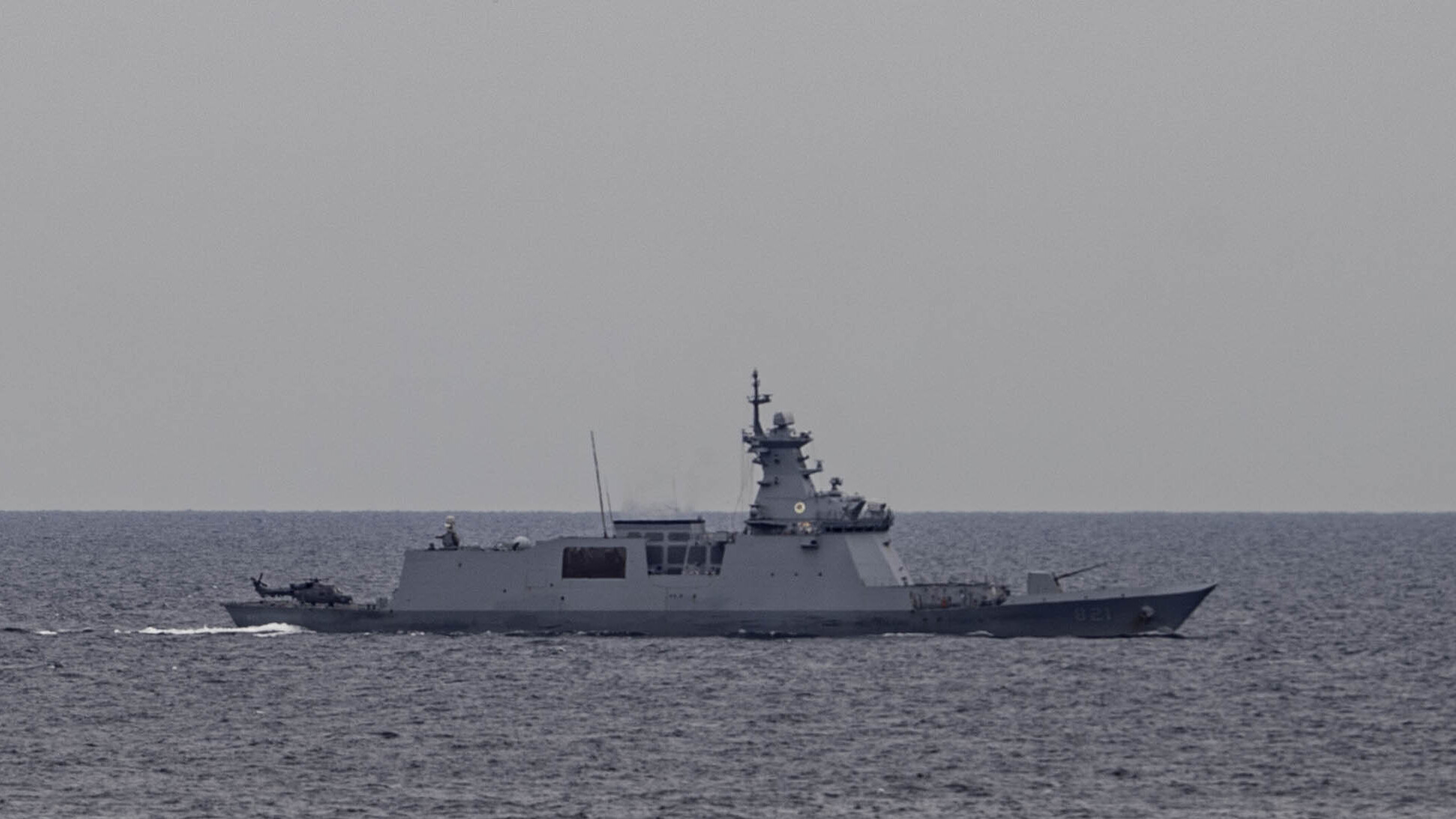
ROKS Seoul (Daegu class)

=== Corvettes ===
Corvettes (PCC) are named after cities, with the exception of Sinseong (one of Admiral Yi Sunshin's battle grounds).

Class	ROKN classification	Hull number	Name	Hangul name (Hanja)	Displacement (light/full, tons)	Launch date	Delivery date	Commission date	Builder	Note
Active (2)
Pohang class (Note: Being phased out, to be replaced by Incheon and Daegu-class frigates (17 removed from service.).)	PCC: Patrol Combat Corvette									
Pohang class	PCC: Patrol Combat Corvette	783	Sinseong	신성 (新城)	950/1,220	1991-10-08	1992-03-28	-	Hanjin Heavy Industries	Lead ship of PCC Batch-VI; 2nd Sinseong after PCE 1001/711
Pohang class	PCC: Patrol Combat Corvette	785	Gongju	공주 (公州)	950/1,220	1992-09-21	1993-07-31	-	Korea Tacoma	2nd Gongju after YMS 516

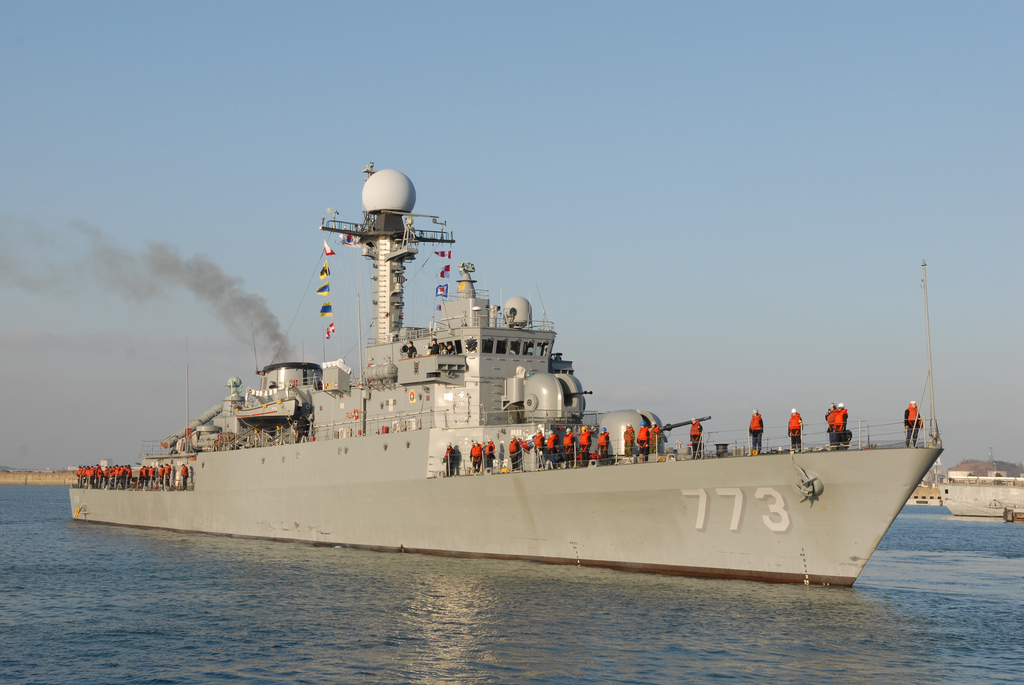
ROKS Bucheon (Pohang class)

=== Patrol vessels ===
Yoon Youngha class (PKG) is named for Navy heroes.

Chamsuri (PKM) means the sea eagle in Korean.

Class	ROKN classification	Hull number	Name	Hangul name (Hanja)	Displacement (light/full, tons)	Launch date	Delivery date	Commission date	Builder	Note
Yoon Youngha class (Note: The Yoon Youngha class has the Pump-jet propulsion system aside from the CODAG.)	PKG: Patrol Killer Guided-missile	711	ROKS Yoon Youngha	윤영하 (尹永夏)	440/570	2007-06-28	2008-12-16	2008-12-17	Hanjin Heavy Industries	Named after the skipper of ROKS Chamsuri 357; Lead ship of PKX-A
Yoon Youngha class	PKG: Patrol Killer Guided-missile	712	ROKS Han Sanggook	한상국 (韓相國)	440/570	2009-09-23	2011-09-14	2011-09-15	STX Offshore & Shipbuilding	-
Yoon Youngha class	PKG: Patrol Killer Guided-missile	713	ROKS Jo Chunhyung	조천형 (趙天衡)	440/570	2009-09-23	2011-09-30	2011-10-04	STX Offshore & Shipbuilding	-
Yoon Youngha class	PKG: Patrol Killer Guided-missile	715	ROKS Hwang Dohyun	황도현 (黃道顯)	440/570	2009-12-11	2011-11-10	2011-11-11	STX Offshore & Shipbuilding	-
Yoon Youngha class	PKG: Patrol Killer Guided-missile	716	ROKS Suh Hoowon	서후원 (徐厚源)	440/570	2009-12-11	2011-09-02	2011-09-26	STX Offshore & Shipbuilding	-
Yoon Youngha class	PKG: Patrol Killer Guided-missile	717	ROKS Park Donghyuk	박동혁 (朴東赫)	440/570	2010-07-28	2011-09-23	2011-09-26	Hanjin Heavy Industries	-
Yoon Youngha class	PKG: Patrol Killer Guided-missile	718	ROKS Hyun Sihak	현시학 (玄時學)	440/570	2010-07-28	2011-10-15	2011-10-28	Hanjin Heavy Industries	-
Yoon Youngha class	PKG: Patrol Killer Guided-missile	719	ROKS Jung Geungmo	정긍모 (鄭兢謨)	440/570	2010-11-02	2011-12-16	2011-12-19	Hanjin Heavy Industries	
Yoon Youngha class	PKG: Patrol Killer Guided-missile	721	ROKS Ji Deokchil	지덕칠 (池德七)	440/570	2010-11-02	2011-12-23	2011-12-23	Hanjin Heavy Industries	
Yoon Youngha class	PKG: Patrol Killer Guided-missile	722	ROKS Lim Byeongrae	임병래 (林炳來)	440/570	2012-11-20	2013-09-03	2013-09-06	STX Offshore & Shipbuilding	
Yoon Youngha class	PKG: Patrol Killer Guided-missile	723	ROKS Hong Siuk	홍시욱 (洪時旭)	440/570	2012-11-20	2013-10-04	2013-10-10	STX Offshore & Shipbuilding	
Yoon Youngha class	PKG: Patrol Killer Guided-missile	725	ROKS Hong Daeseon	홍대선 (洪大善)	440/570	2012-11-20	2013-11-04	2013-11-05	STX Offshore & Shipbuilding	
Yoon Youngha class	PKG: Patrol Killer Guided-missile	726	ROKS Han Munsik	한문식 (韓文植)	440/570	2013-04-24	2014-01-27	2014-01-28	Hanjin Heavy Industries	-
Yoon Youngha class	PKG: Patrol Killer Guided-missile	727	ROKS Kim Changhak	김창학 (金昌學)	440/570	2013-04-24	2014-02-28	2014-03-04	Hanjin Heavy Industries	
Yoon Youngha class	PKG: Patrol Killer Guided-missile	728	ROKS Park Dongjin	박동진 (朴東鎭)	440/570	2013-04-24	2014-03-28	2014-04-01	Hanjin Heavy Industries	
Yoon Youngha class	PKG: Patrol Killer Guided-missile	729	ROKS Kim Soohyun	김수현 (金壽鉉)	440/570	2014-04-30	2014-09-30	2014-10-02	STX Offshore & Shipbuilding	
Yoon Youngha class	PKG: Patrol Killer Guided-missile	732	ROKS Jeon Byeongik	전병익 (全炳翼)	440/570	2016-06-24	2017-12-29	2018-01-11	STX Offshore & Shipbuilding	Last ship of PKX-A (no PKG 731)
Yoon Youngha class	PKG: Patrol Killer Guided-missile	733	ROKS Lee Byeongcheol	이병철 (李丙喆)	440/570	2014-04-30	2014-11-28	2014-12-03	STX Offshore & Shipbuilding	
Chamsuri (PKMR 211) class (Note: The Chamsuri 211 class has the Pump-jet propulsion system aside from the CODAG.)	PKMR: Patrol Killer Medium Rocket	211	Chamsuri 211	참수리 211	210/250	2016-07-26	2017-10-30	2017-11-01	Hanjin Heavy Industries	Lead ship of PKX-B Batch-I (16 in batch); 34 in class
Chamsuri (PKMR 211) class	PKMR: Patrol Killer Medium Rocket	212	Chamsuri 212	참수리 212	210/250	2018-12-21	2019-11-26	2019-11-28	Hanjin Heavy Industries	
Chamsuri (PKMR 211) class	PKMR: Patrol Killer Medium Rocket	213	Chamsuri 213	참수리 213	210/250	2018-12-21	2019-12	2019-12-18	Hanjin Heavy Industries	-
Chamsuri (PKMR 211) class	PKMR: Patrol Killer Medium Rocket	215	Chamsuri 215	참수리 215	210/250	2018-12-21	2019-12	2019-12-31	Hanjin Heavy Industries	-
Chamsuri (PKMR 211) class	PKMR: Patrol Killer Medium Rocket	216	Chamsuri 216	참수리 216	210/250	2019-12-13	2020-10-19	2020-10-20	Hanjin Heavy Industries	-
Chamsuri (PKMR 211) class	PKMR: Patrol Killer Medium Rocket	217	Chamsuri 217	참수리 217	210/250	2019-12-13	2021-04-28	-	Hanjin Heavy Industries	-
Chamsuri (PKMR 211) class	PKMR: Patrol Killer Medium Rocket	218	Chamsuri 218	참수리 218	210/250	2019-12-13	2021-04-28	-	Hanjin Heavy Industries	-
Chamsuri (PKMR 211) class	PKMR: Patrol Killer Medium Rocket	219	Chamsuri 219	참수리 219	210/250	2019-12-13	2021-04-28	-	Hanjin Heavy Industries	-
Chamsuri (PKMR 211) class	PKMR: Patrol Killer Medium Rocket	221	Chamsuri 221	참수리 221	210/250	2020-12-29	2021-12	-	Hanjin Heavy Industries	
Chamsuri (PKMR 211) class	PKMR: Patrol Killer Medium Rocket	222	Chamsuri 222	참수리 222	210/250	2020-12-29	2021-12-23	-	Hanjin Heavy Industries	
Chamsuri (PKMR 211) class	PKMR: Patrol Killer Medium Rocket	223	Chamsuri 223	참수리 223	210/250	2020-12-29	2021-12-27	-	Hanjin Heavy Industries	
Chamsuri (PKMR 211) class	PKMR: Patrol Killer Medium Rocket	225	Chamsuri 225	참수리 225	210/250	2020-12-29	2021-12-28	-	Hanjin Heavy Industries	
Chamsuri (PKMR 211) class	PKMR: Patrol Killer Medium Rocket	226	Chamsuri 226	참수리 226	210/250	2022-05-12	2022-12-1	-	Hanjin Heavy Industries	Contract awarded
Chamsuri (PKMR 211) class	PKMR: Patrol Killer Medium Rocket	227	Chamsuri 227	참수리 227	210/250	2022-05-12	2022-12-12	-	Hanjin Heavy Industries	
Chamsuri (PKMR 211) class	PKMR: Patrol Killer Medium Rocket	228	Chamsuri 228	참수리 228	210/250	2022-05-12	2022-12-20	-	Hanjin Heavy Industries	
Chamsuri (PKMR 211) class	PKMR: Patrol Killer Medium Rocket	229	Chamsuri 229	참수리 229	210/250	2022-05-12	2022-12-26	-	Hanjin Heavy Industries	
Chamsuri (PKM 268) class	PKM: Patrol Killer Medium	298 - 375	Chamsuri 313 - 375	참수리 313 - 375	151/170	-	-	-	-	35 in service (105 built from 1978 to 1993); To be replaced by PKG & PKMR

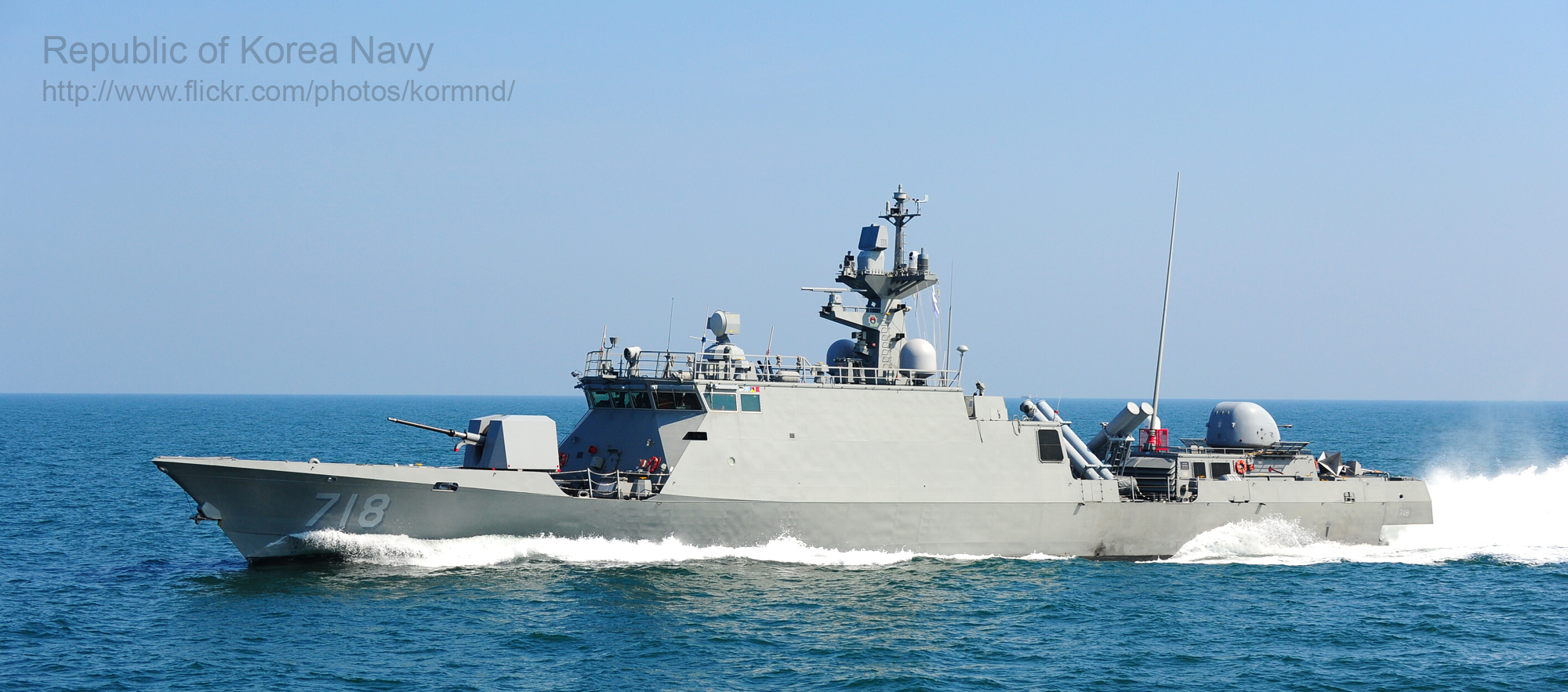
ROKS Hyun Sihak (Yoon Youngha class)

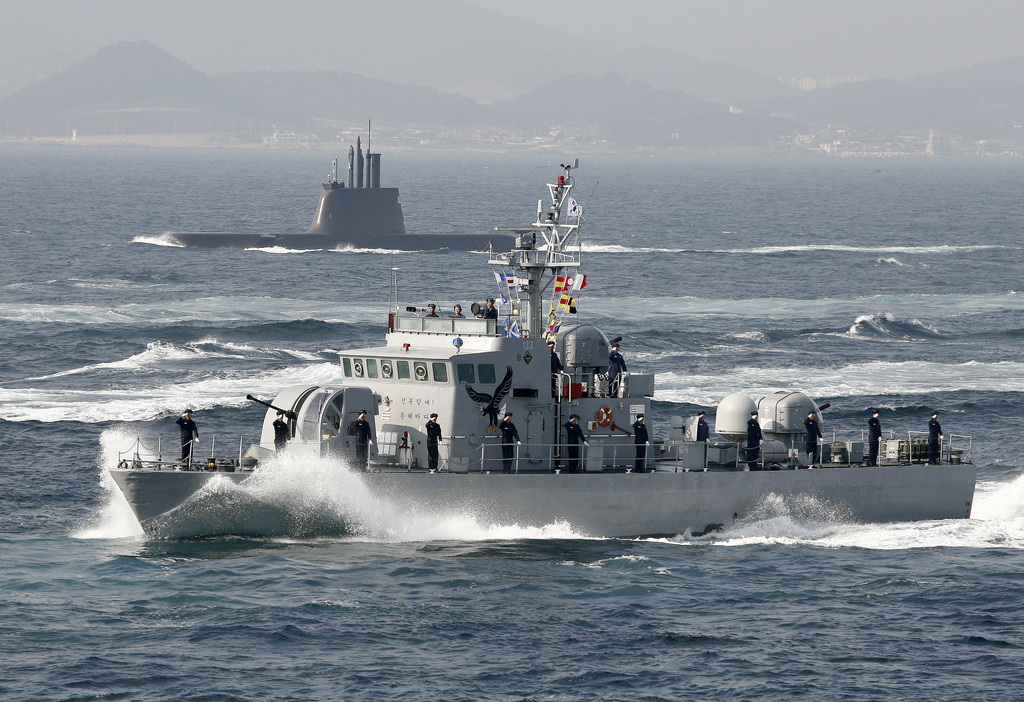
A Chamsuri-class patrol craft and a Sohn Wonyil-class submarine on background

=== Amphibious warfare ships ===
Dokdo class (LPH) is named for islands. Cheonwangbong class and Gojunbong (LST) class are named for mountain peaks.

Solgae (LSF) means the black kite in Korean.

Class	ROKN classification	Hull number	Name	Hangul name (Hanja)	Displacement (light/full, tons)	Launch date	Delivery date	Commission date	Builder	Note
Dokdo class	LPH: Landing Transport Helicopter	6111	Dokdo	독도 (獨島)	14,550/19,000	2005-07-12	2007-07-02	2007-07-03	Hanjin Heavy Industries	2nd Dokdo after LSM 603
Dokdo class	LPH: Landing Transport Helicopter	6112	Marado	마라도 (馬羅島)	14,500/19,000	2018-05-14	2021-06-24	2021-06-28	Hanjin Heavy Industries	-
Cheonwangbong class	LST: Landing Ship Tank	686	ROKS Cheonwangbong	천왕봉 (天王峰)	4,900/6,940	2013-09-11	2014-11-28	2014-12-01	Hanjin Heavy Industries	Lead ship of LST-II (4 in class)
Cheonwangbong class	LST: Landing Ship Tank	687	ROKS Cheonjabong	천자봉 (天子峰)	4,900/6,940	2015-12-15	2017-08-01	2017-08-04	Hyundai Heavy Industries	-
Cheonwangbong class	LST: Landing Ship Tank	688	ROKS Ilchulbong	일출봉 (日出峰)	4,900/6,940	2016-10-25	2018-04-02	2018-04-11	Hyundai Heavy Industries	-
Cheonwangbong class	LST: Landing Ship Tank	689	ROKS Nojeokbong	노적봉 (露積峰)	4,900/6,940	2017-11-02	2018-11-21	2018-12-3	Hyundai Heavy Industries	-
Gojunbong class	LST: Landing Ship Tank	681	ROKS Gojunbong	고준봉 (孤隼峰)	2,900/4,360	1992-09-04	1993-06-16	1993-06-19	Korea Tacoma	-
Gojunbong class	LST: Landing Ship Tank	682	ROKS Birobong	비로봉 (毗盧峰)	2,900/4,360	1996-12-18	1997-11-27	1997-12-01	Korea Shipbuilding Corp.	-
Gojunbong class	LST: Landing Ship Tank	683	ROKS Hyangnobong	향로봉 (香爐峰)	2,900/4,360	1998-10-30	1999-08-29	1999-08-30	Hanjin Heavy Industries	-
Gojunbong class	LST: Landing Ship Tank	685	ROKS Seonginbong	성인봉 (聖人峰)	2,900/4,360	1999-03-04	1999-11-30	1999-12-01	Hanjin Heavy Industries	-
Solgae 631-class	LSF: Landing Ship Fast	631	ROKS Solgae 631	솔개 631	95/155	-	2007-04-02	2007-10-xx	Hanjin Heavy Industries	Lead ship of LSF-II; Locally built LCAC
Solgae 631-class	LSF: Landing Ship Fast	632	ROKS Solgae 632	솔개 632	95/155	-	2007-04-xx	2007-10-xx	Hanjin Heavy Industries	-
Solgae 631-class	LSF: Landing Ship Fast	633	Solgae 633	솔개 633	-	2021-12-14	2023-06-01	-	Hanjin Heavy Industries	Laid down; Lead ship of LSF-II phase II
Solgae 631-class	LSF: Landing Ship Fast	635	Solgae 635	솔개 635	-	2021-12-14	2023-06-01	-	Hanjin Heavy Industries	Laid down
Solgae 631-class	LSF: Landing Ship Fast	636	Solgae 636	솔개 636	-	2023-05-17	-	-	Hanjin Heavy Industries	Contract awarded
Solgae 631-class	LSF: Landing Ship Fast	637	Solgae 637	솔개 637	-	2023-05-17	-	-	Hanjin Heavy Industries	Contract awarded
Solgae 631-class	LSF: Landing Ship Fast	638	Solgae 638	솔개 638	-	-	-	-	Hanjin Heavy Industries	Contract awarded
Solgae 631-class	LSF: Landing Ship Fast	639	Solgae 639	솔개 639	-	-	-	-	Hanjin Heavy Industries	Contract awarded
Solgae 621-class	LSF: Landing Ship Fast	621	Solgae 621	솔개 621	132/149	2004-04-24 (Laid down)	2005-12-28	2005-12-28	Khabarovsk Shipyard	Assault hovercraft (Project 12061E Murena-E) transferred from Russia
Solgae 621-class	LSF: Landing Ship Fast	622	Solgae 622	솔개 622	132/149	-	2006-09-22	2006-10-15	Khabarovsk Shipyard	Assault hovercraft (Project 12061E Murena-E) transferred from Russia
Solgae 621-class	LSF: Landing Ship Fast	623	Solgae 623	솔개 623	132/149	-	2007-01-15	2007-01-15	Khabarovsk Shipyard	Assault hovercraft (Project 12061E Murena-E) transferred from Russia

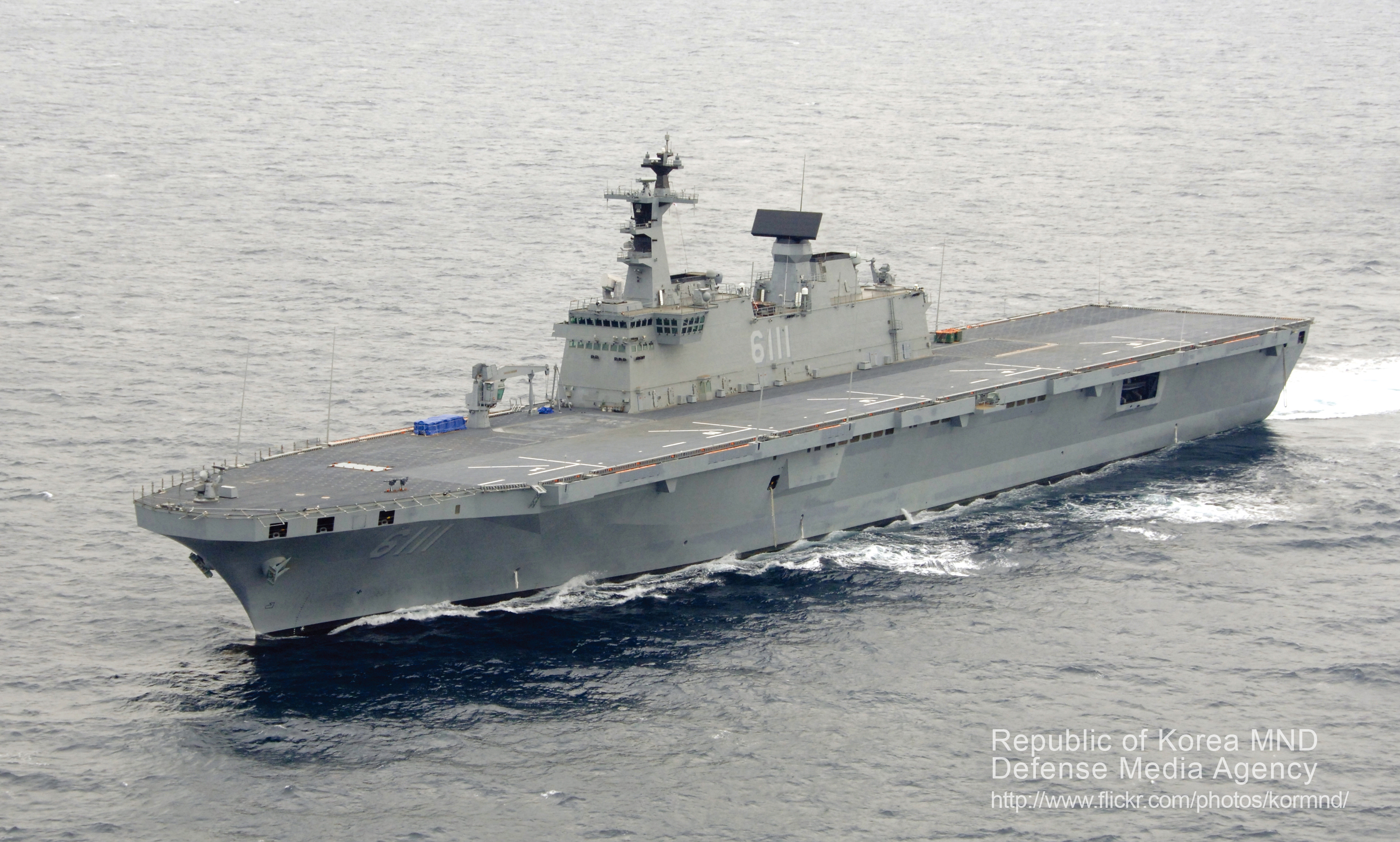
ROKS Dokdo (Dokdo class)

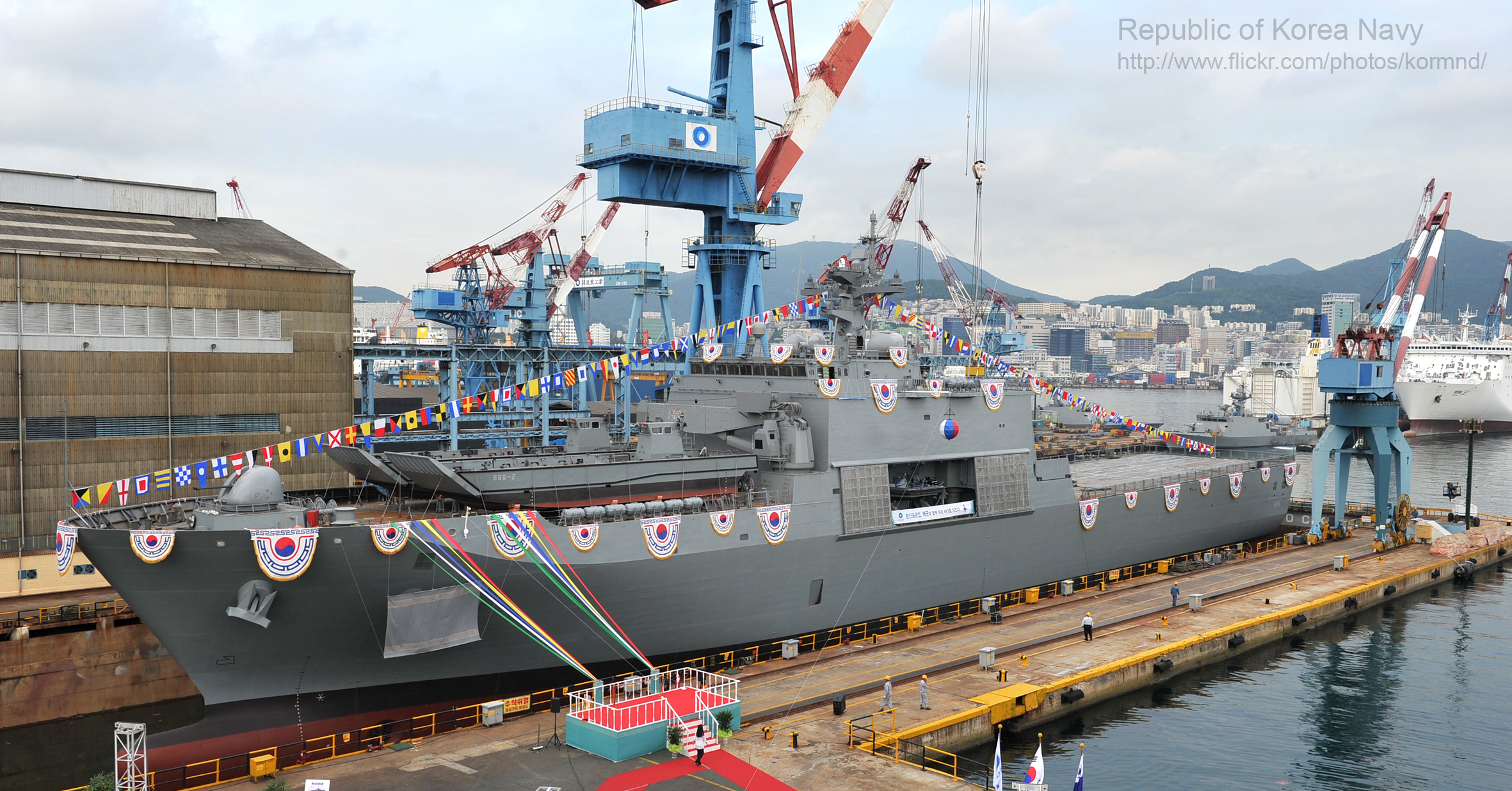
ROKS Cheonwangbong (Cheonwangbong class)

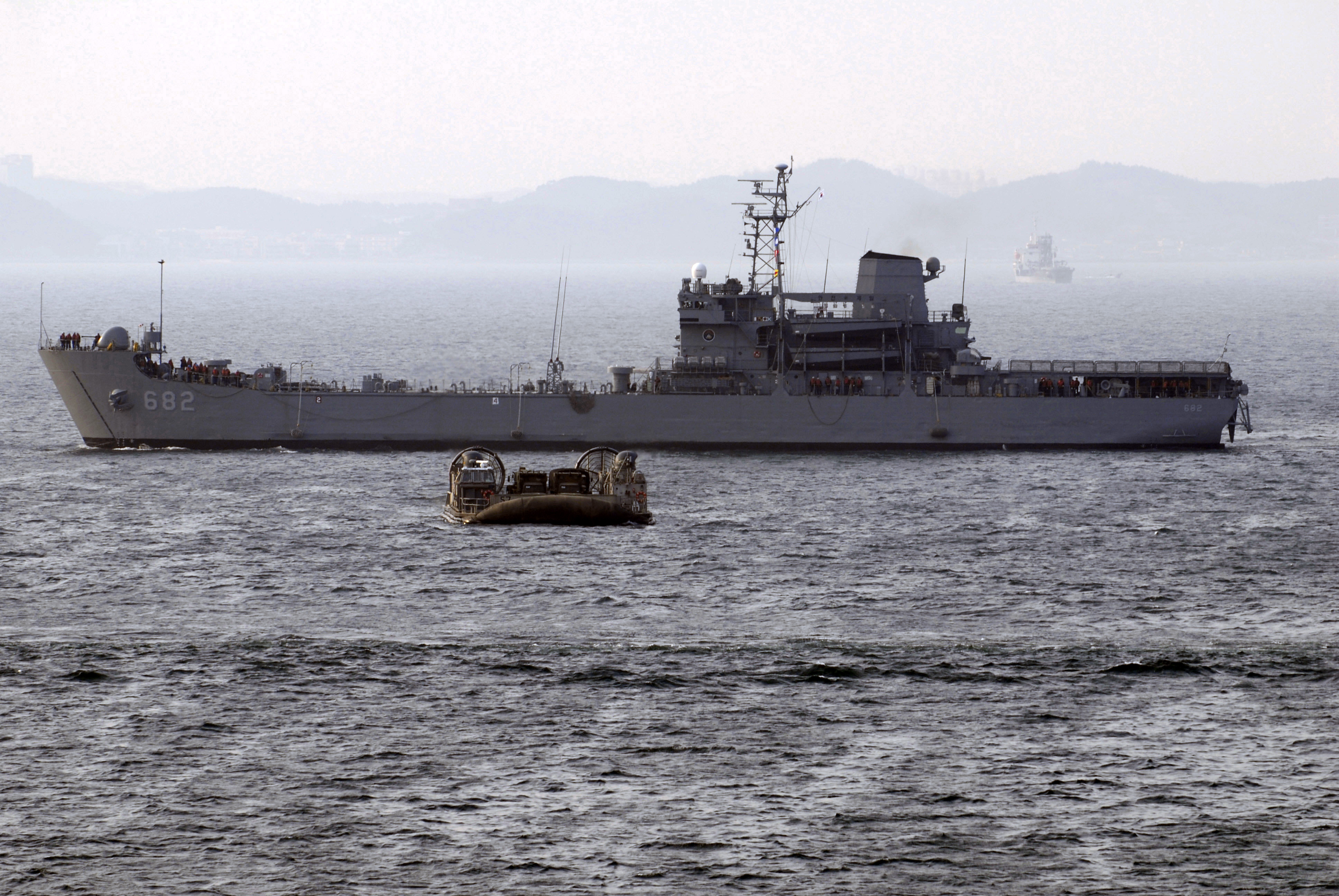
ROKS Birobong (Gojunbong class)

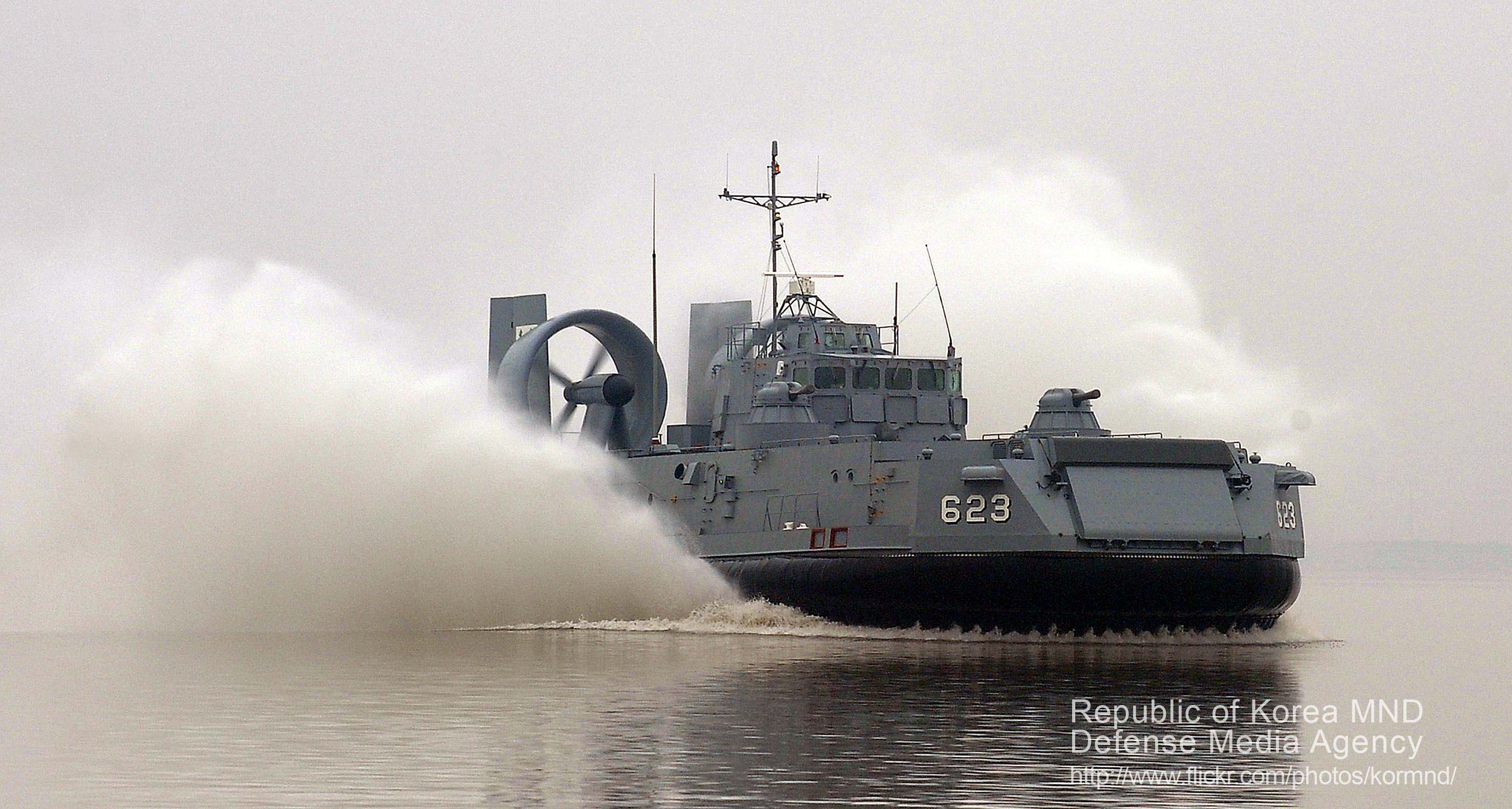
ROKS Solgae 623 (Solgae 621-class)

=== Mine warfare ships ===
Nampo class and Wonsan class (MLS) are named after places known for naval mine operations during the Korean War.

Yangyang class (MSH) is named for sea-side counties. Ganggyeong class (MHC) is named for towns that names are previously used by decommissioned minesweepers.

Class	ROKN classification	Hull number	Name	Hangul name (Hanja)	Displacement (light/full, tons)	Launch date	Delivery date	Commission date	Builder	Note
Nampo class	MLS: Mine Layer Ship	570	Nampo	남포 (南浦)	3,000/4,240	2015-5-27	2017-06-09	2017-06-16	Hyundai Heavy Industries	MLS-II; 3rd Nampo after LCI 106, AKL 905
Wonsan class	MLS: Mine Layer Ship	560	Wonsan	원산 (元山)	2,500/3,440	1996-09-20	1997-09-30	1998-02-05	Hyundai Heavy Industries	2nd Wonsan after AKL 903
Yangyang class (Note: Fiber Reinforced Plastic (FRP) monocoque hull structure.)	MSH: Mine Sweeper Hunter	571	Yangyang	양양 (襄陽)	730/923	1999-02-25	1999-12-29	1999-12-31	Kangnam Corp.	-
Yangyang class	MSH: Mine Sweeper Hunter	572	Ongjin	옹진 (甕津)	730/923	2002-12-28	2003-09-01	2003-10-28	Kangnam Corp.	-
Yangyang class	MSH: Mine Sweeper Hunter	573	Haenam	해남 (海南)	730/923	2004-02-18	2004-10-30	2004-11-12	Kangnam Corp.	-
Yangyang class	MSH: Mine Sweeper Hunter	575	Namhae	남해 (南海)	730/923	2020-04-07	2021-11-19	2021-11-23	Kangnam Corp.	Lead ship of MSH phase II
Yangyang class	MSH: Mine Sweeper Hunter	576	Hongseong	홍성 (洪城)	730/923	2020-09-11	2022-10-18	2022-10-20	Kangnam Corp.	-
Yangyang class	MSH: Mine Sweeper Hunter	577	Goseong	고성 (高城)	730/923	2021-03-04	2022-12-26	2023-07-10	Kangnam Corp.	Laid down
Ganggyeong class (Note: Fiber Reinforced Plastic (FRP) monocoque hull structure.)	MHC: Mine Hunter Coastal	561	ROKS Ganggyeong (Kang Kyung)	강경 (江景)	450/512	1986-08-30	1986-12-19	1986-12-22	Kangnam Corp.	2nd Ganggyeong after YMS 510
Ganggyeong class	MHC: Mine Hunter Coastal	562	ROKS Gangjin	강진 (康津)	450/512	1990-10-27	1991-05-31	1991-06-03	Kangnam Corp.	2nd Gangjin after YMS 501
Ganggyeong class	MHC: Mine Hunter Coastal	563	ROKS Goryeong	고령 (高靈)	450/512	1991-01-14	1991-11-30	1991-12-01	Kangnam Corp.	2nd Goryeong after YMS 515
Ganggyeong class	MHC: Mine Hunter Coastal	565	ROKS Gimpo	김포 (金浦)	450/512	1992-09-29	1993-04-30	1993-05-01	Kangnam Corp.	2nd Gimpo after AMS 520
Ganggyeong class	MHC: Mine Hunter Coastal	566	ROKS Gochang	고창 (高敞)	450/512	1993-03-30	1993-10-29	1993-11-01	Kangnam Corp.	2nd Gochang after AMS 521
Ganggyeong class	MHC: Mine Hunter Coastal	567	ROKS Gimhwa	김화 (金化)	450/512	1993-08-01	1994-04-xx	1994-05-02	Kangnam Corp.	Name changed from Geumhwa to Gimhwa on Feb 1, 2018; 2nd Geumhwa after AMS 519

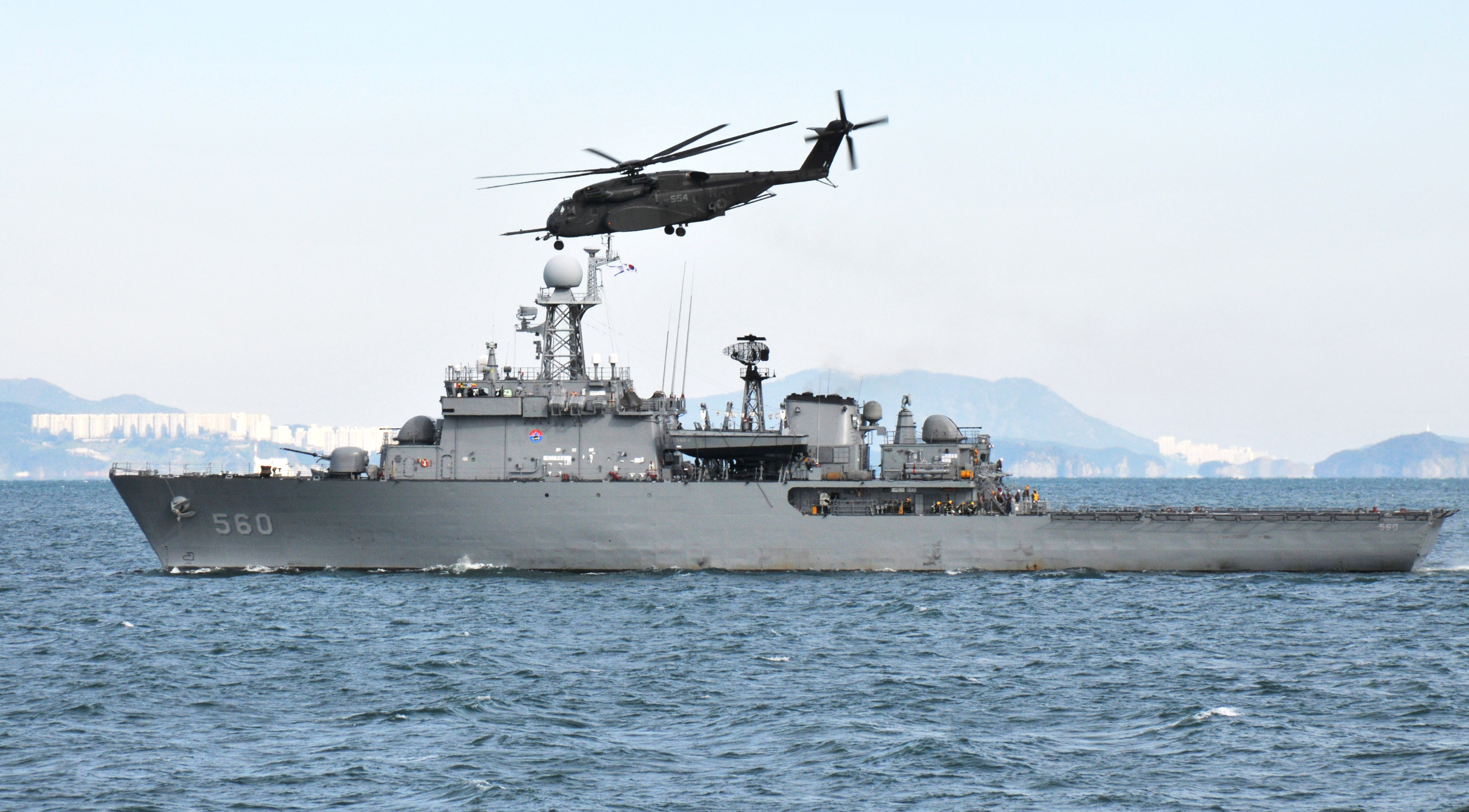
ROKS Wonsan (Wonsan class)

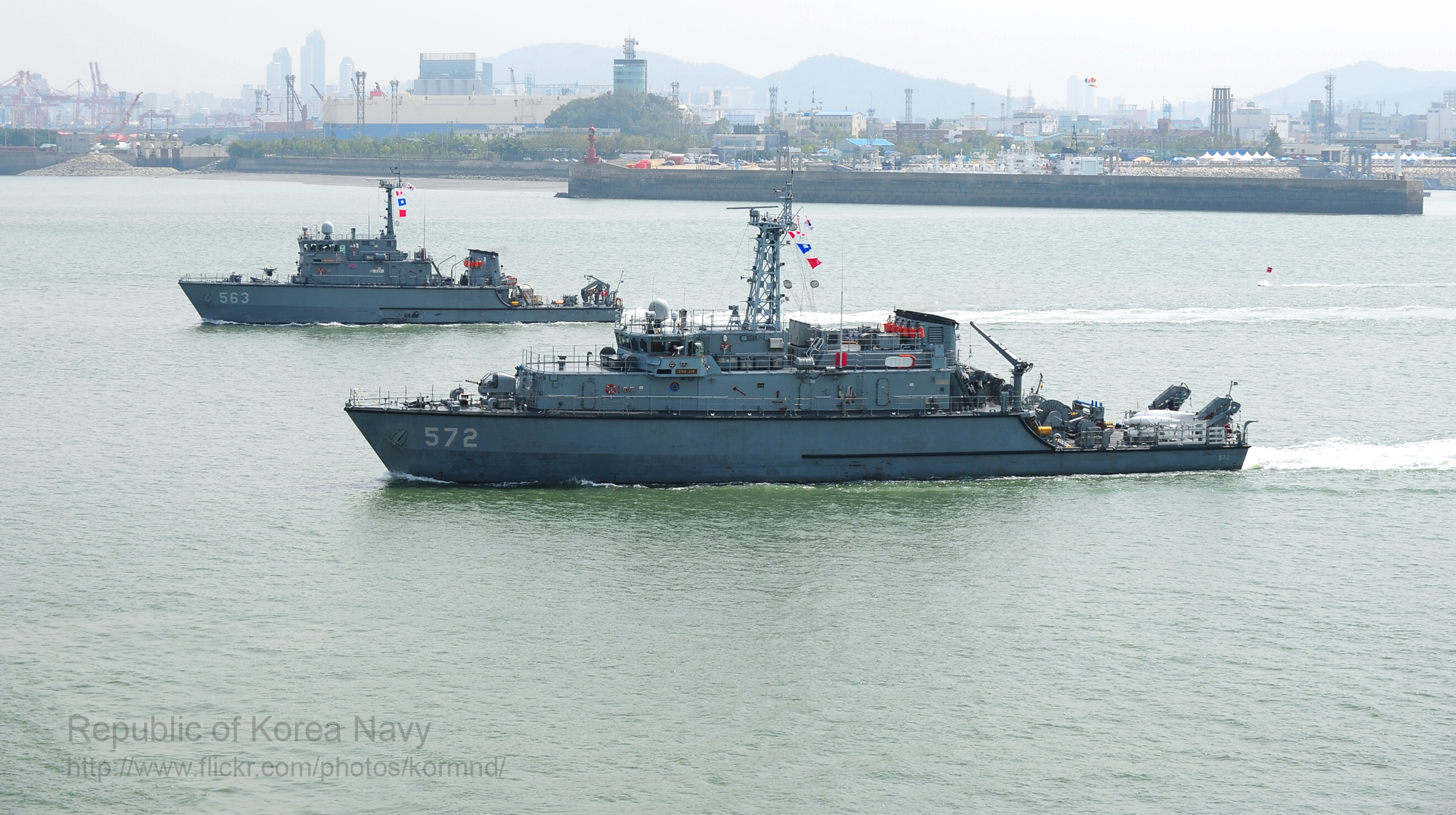
ROKS Ongjin (Yangyang class) and ROKS Goryeong (Ganggyeong class) on background

=== Auxiliary ships ===
ATH is named for an island where Admiral Yi Sunshin's HQ was located. AOEs are named for lakes.

Tongyeong class have legacy names of previous ROK Navy ships. ASR is named for a base established by Commissioner Chang Bogo.

Singiwon and Sinsegi (AGS) mean a new era and a new century in Korean, respectively.

Mulgae (LCU) means the fur seal in Korean.

Class	ROKN classification	Hull number	Name	Hangul name (Hanja)	Displacement (light/full, tons)	Launch date	Delivery date	Commission date	Builder	Note
Hansando class	ATH: Training Ship Helicopter	81	Hansando	한산도 (閑山島)	4,500/6,000	2018-11-16	2020-10-21	2020-10-22	Hyundai Heavy Industries	2nd ship named for Battle of Hansan Island after PCE 53
Soyang class	AOE: Fast Combat Support Ship	51	Soyang	소양 (昭陽)	10,600/22,000	2016-11-29	2018-09-07	2018-09-18	Hyundai Heavy Industries	AOE-II; 2nd Soyang after AOG 55; To be followed by AOE-II phase II
Cheonji class	AOE: Fast Combat Support Ship	57	Cheonji	천지 (天池)	4,200/9,170	1990-07-26	1990-12-29	1991-01-04	Hyundai Heavy Industries	2nd Cheonji after AO 2/51
Cheonji class	AOE: Fast Combat Support Ship	58	Daecheong	대청 (大淸)	4,200/9,170	1997-01-20	1997-11-28	1997-12-01	Hyundai Heavy Industries	-
Cheonji class	AOE: Fast Combat Support Ship	59	Hwacheon	화천 (華川)	4,180/9,180	1997-08-27	1998-04-30	1998-05-01	Hyundai Heavy Industries	2nd Hwacheon after AO 5/52
Tongyeong class	ATS: Salvage and Rescue Ship	31	Tongyeong	통영 (統營)	3,500/4,710	2012-09-04	2014-12-30	2014-12-31	Daewoo S&ME	Lead ship of ATS-II (2 in class); 2nd Tongyeong after JMS 302
Tongyeong class	ATS: Salvage and Rescue Ship	32	Gwangyang	광양 (光陽)	3,500/4,710	2015-06-30	2016-09-29	2016-10-10	Hanjin Heavy Industries	3rd Gwangyang after AKL 62, ATS 28
Ganghwado class	ASR-II: Submarine Rescue Ship	22	Ganghwado	강화도 (江華島)	5,600/6,800	2021-10-07	2024-11-01	2024-11-11	Daewoo S&ME	
Cheonghaejin class	ASR: Submarine Rescue Ship	21	Cheonghaejin	청해진 (淸海鎭)	3,200/4,300	1995-10-18	1996-11-30	1996-12-02	Daewoo S&ME	To be followed by ASR-II
Singiwon class	AGS: Surveying Ship	13	Singiwon	신기원 (新紀元)	3,500/4,600	2012-xx-xx	-	2014-12-xx	-	AGX-II
Sinsegi class	AGS: Surveying Ship	12	Sinsegi	신세기 (新世紀)	2,850/3,700	2002-05-27	-	2003-xx-xx	-	AGX-I
Mulgae (LCU 87) class	LCU: Landing Craft Utility	87	Mulgae 87	물개 87	540/940	-	-	-	Hanjin Heavy Industries	Lead ship of 500-ton Mulgae LCU; Littoral transport and logistics support
Mulgae (LCU 87) class	LCU: Landing Craft Utility	88	Mulgae 88	물개 88	540/940	-	-	-	Hanjin Heavy Industries	-
Mulgae (LCU 87) class	LCU: Landing Craft Utility	89	Mulgae 89	물개 89	540/940	-	-	-	Hanjin Heavy Industries	-
Mulgae (LCU/L 79) class	LCU/L: Landing Craft Utility Minelayer	79	Mulgae 79	물개 79	235/442	-	-	-	Hanjin Heavy Industries	Lead ship of LCU/L; Littoral transport, logistics support, and mine warfare support
Mulgae (LCU/L 79) class	LCU/L: Landing Craft Utility Minelayer	81	Mulgae 81	물개 81	235/442	-	-	-	Hanjin Heavy Industries	-
Mulgae (LCU/L 79) class	LCU/L: Landing Craft Utility Minelayer	82	"Mulgae 82"	물개 82	235/442	-	-	-	Hanjin Heavy Industries	-
Mulgae (LCU/L 79) class	LCU/L: Landing Craft Utility Minelayer	83	Mulgae 83	물개 83	235/442	-	-	-	Hanjin Heavy Industries	-
Mulgae (LCU/L 79) class	LCU/L: Landing Craft Utility Minelayer	85	Mulgae 85	물개 85	235/442	-	-	-	Hanjin Heavy Industries	-
Mulgae (LCU/L 79) class	LCU/L: Landing Craft Utility Minelayer	86	Mulgae 86	물개 86	235/442	2010-10-20	2011-02-24	-	Hanjin Heavy Industries	-
Mulgae (LCU/L 79) class	LCU/L: Landing Craft Utility Minelayer	91	Mulgae 91	물개 91	235/442	-	-	2018-xx-xx	Hanjin Heavy Industries	-
Mulgae (LCU/L 79) class	LCU/L: Landing Craft Utility Minelayer	92	Mulgae 92	물개 92	235/442	-	-	-	Hanjin Heavy Industries	Laid down
Mulgae (LCU/L 79) class	LCU/L: Landing Craft Utility Minelayer	93	Mulgae 93	물개 93	235/442	-	-	-	Hanjin Heavy Industries	Laid down

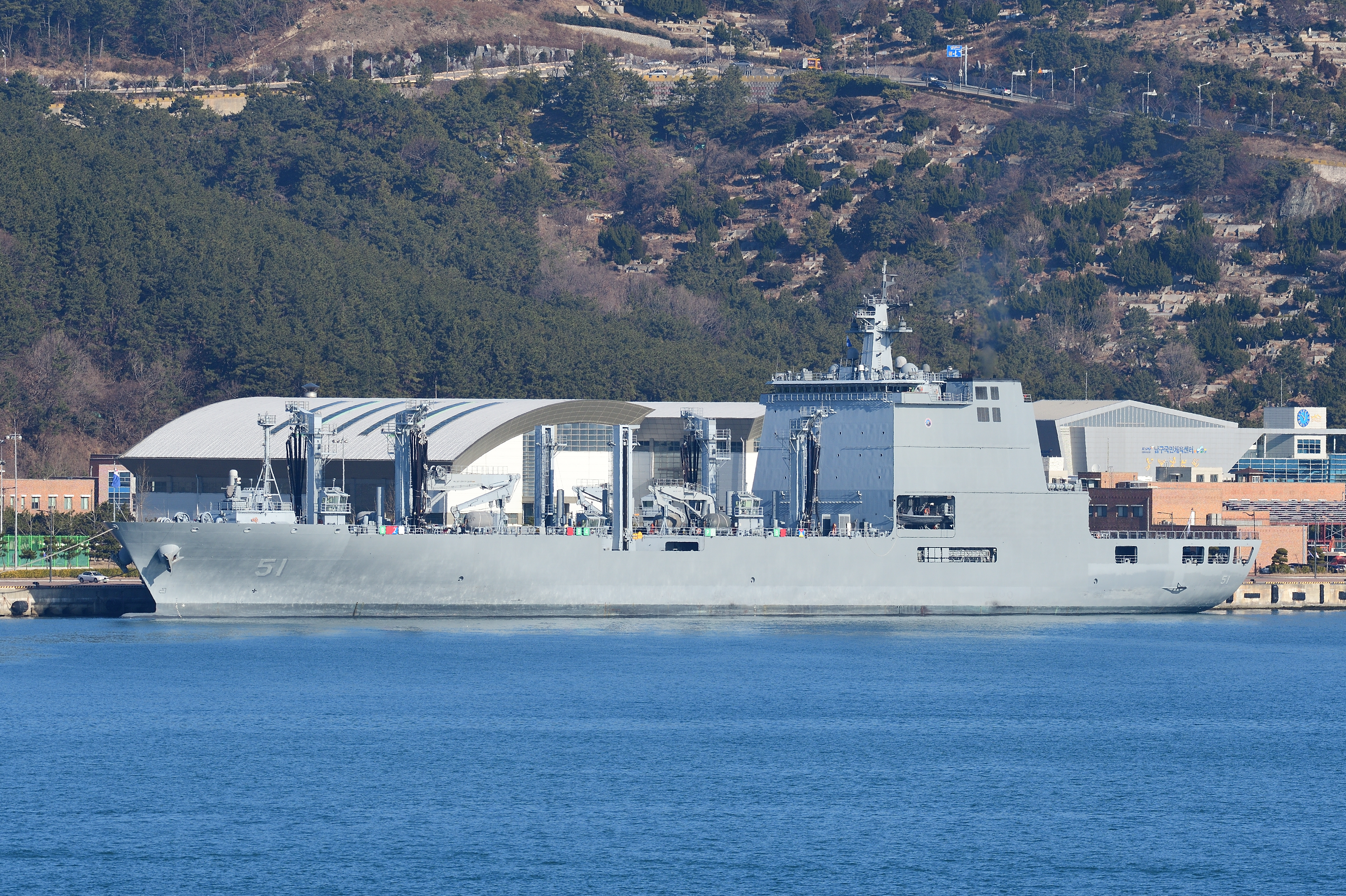
ROKS Soyang (Soyang class)

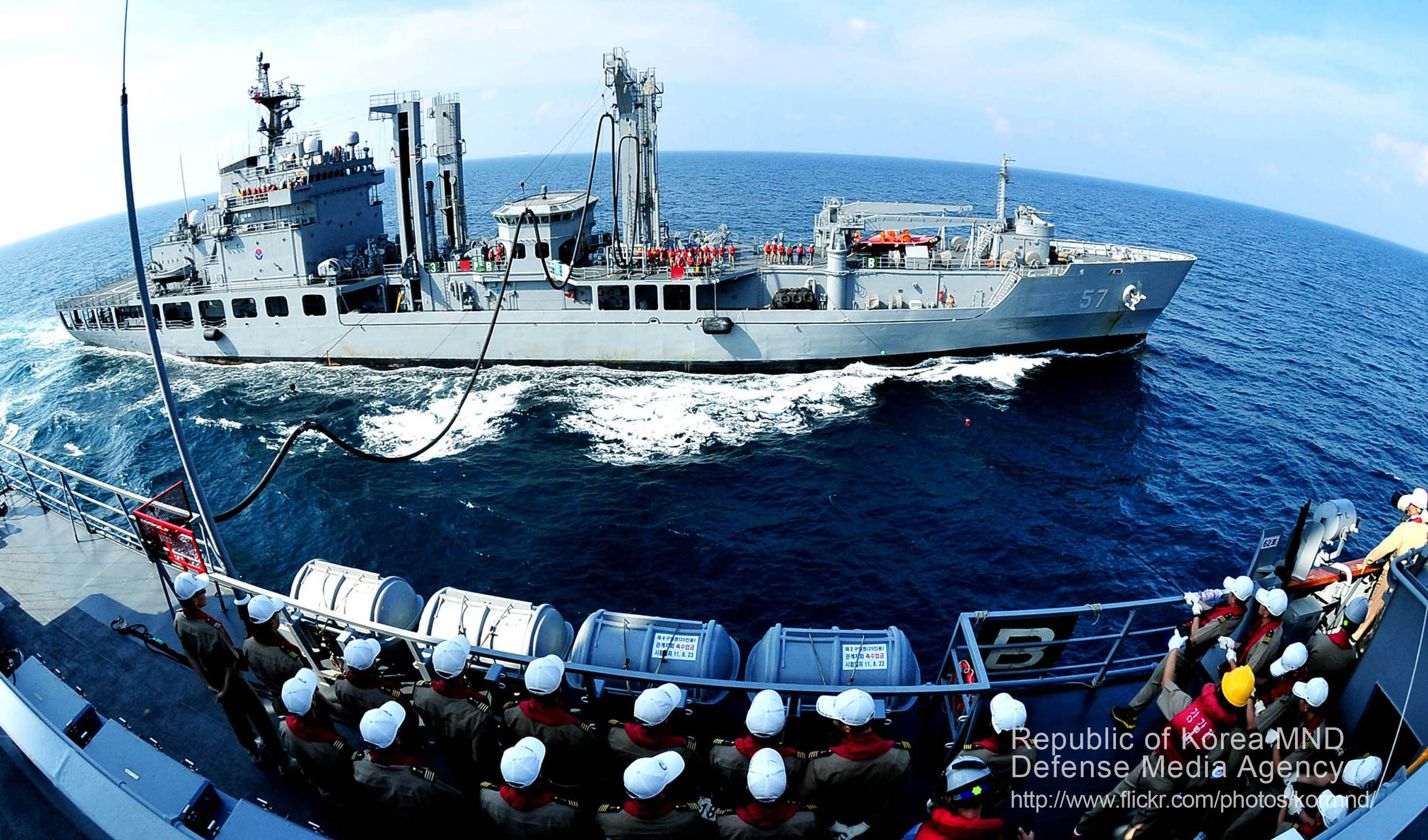
ROKS Cheonji (Cheonji class)

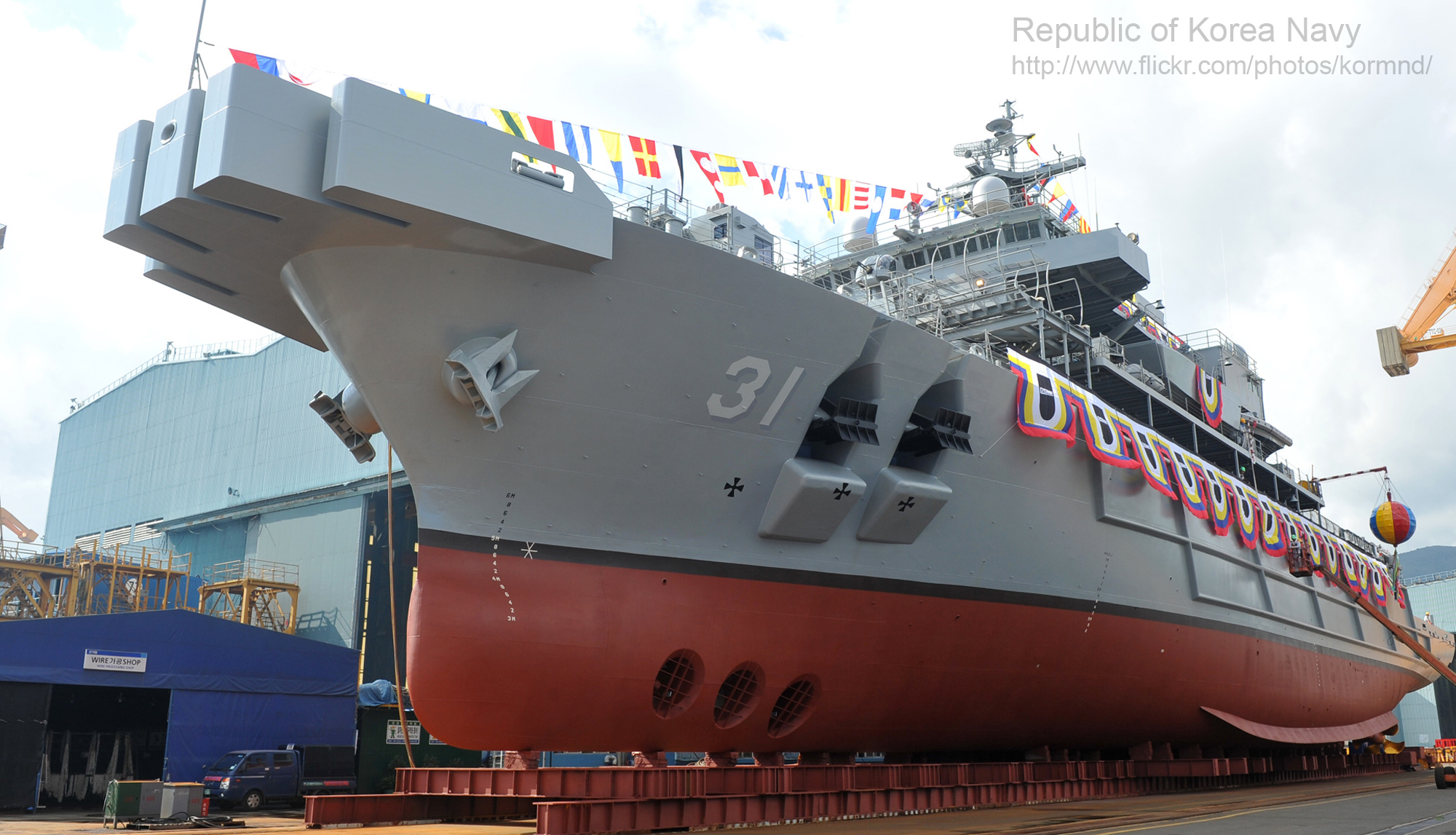
ROKS Tongyeong (Tongyeong class)

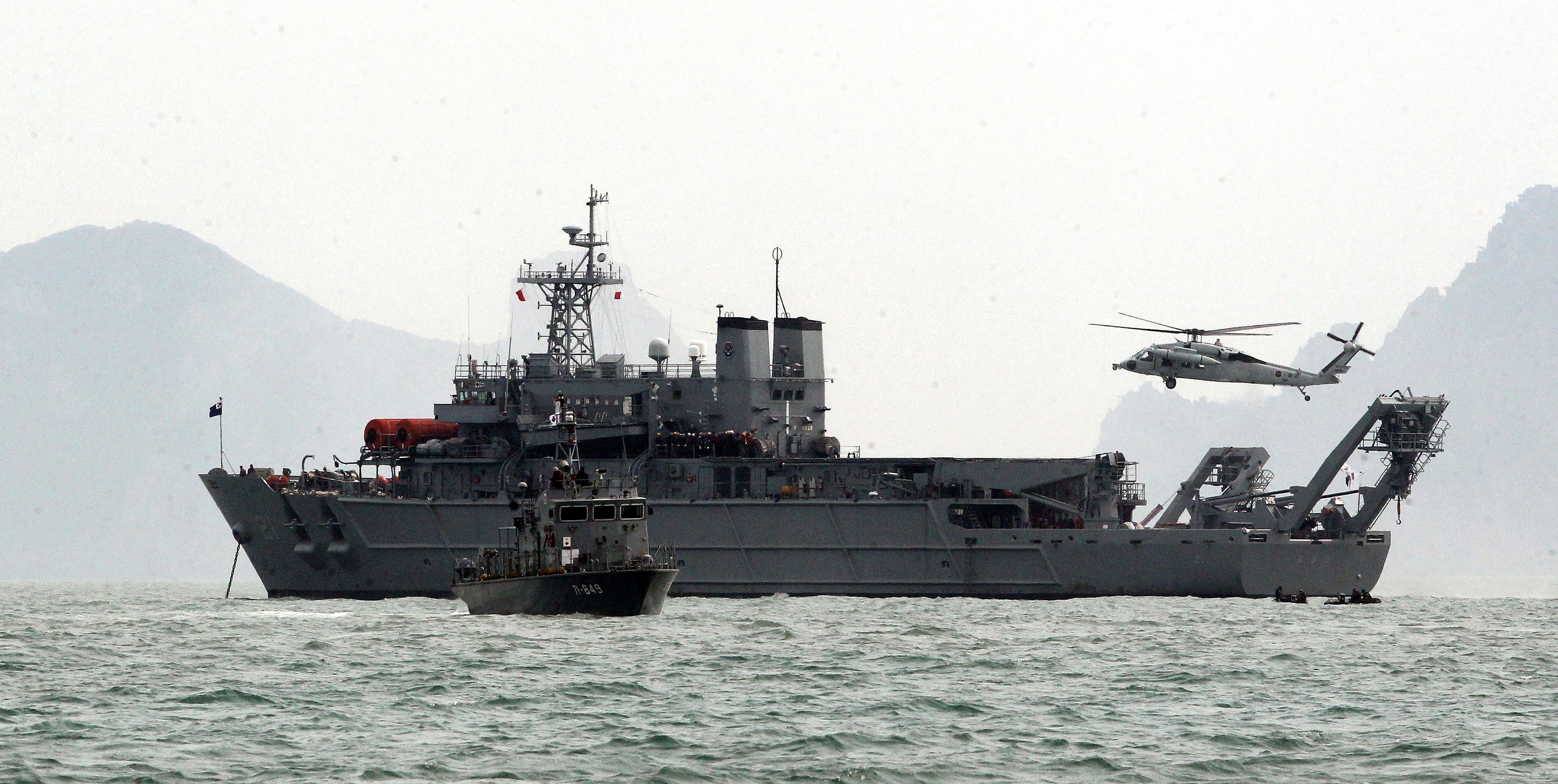
ROKS Cheonghaejin (Cheonghaejin class)

== Major service craft ==
The hull number of service craft starts with Hangul. Service craft have no name.

Class	ROKN classification	Hull number	Name	Hangul name (Hanja)	Displacement (light/full, tons)	Launch date	Delivery date	Commission date	Builder	Note
-	MTB: Multipurpose Training Boat	자-201	-	-	230/280	2017-04-xx	2017-12-28	2018-01-xx	Hanjin Heavy Industries	Catamaran with water jets
-	MTB: Multipurpose Training Boat	자-202	-	-	230/280	2019-02-xx	2019-11-29	2019-12-02	Hanjin Heavy Industries	-
-	MTB: Multipurpose Training Boat	자-203	-	-	230/280	-	-	-	Hanjin Heavy Industries	Contract awarded
-	MTB: Multipurpose Training Boat	자-205	-	-	230/280	-	-	-	Hanjin Heavy Industries	Contract awarded

== See also ==
- List of ships of the Republic of Korea Navy

== Notes ==
a. Hull number: The ROK Navy does not use the number '4' when assigning hull numbers to their ships since ROKS Jirisan (PC 704; formerly USS PC-810), during the Korean War, struck a mine and sank in December 1951, resulting in death of all sailors aboard. Currently only the hull numbers of the mine layers and submarine tender end with number '0'. The hull numbers of the submarines start with the number '0'.
b. Romanization of Ship names: Romanization is according to Revised Romanization of Korean (adopted in 2000), with exceptions of personal names. Names of ships commissioned before 2000 might have been romanized according to McCune–Reischauer. Examples of changes (M-R → RR): Chinhae → Jinhae; Kangnung → Gangneung; Kimpo → Gimpo; Kyongju → Gyeongju; Pusan → Busan; Taegu → Daegu.
c. Delivery date: The date when the ROK Navy acquires a ship from the shipbuilder.
