= ROKS Incheon =

ROKS Incheon is the name of two Republic of Korea Navy warships:

- ROKS Incheon (DD-918), a Daegu-class destroyer from 1973 to 1974.
- ROKS Incheon (FFG-811), a Incheon-class frigate from 2013 to present.
