= ROKS Hansando =

South Korean Navy fast combat support ship

History

South Korea
- Name: Hansando; (한산도)
- Namesake: Hansando
- Builder: Hyundai, Ulsan
- Launched: 16 November 2018
- Acquired: 23 October 2020
- Commissioned: 5 April 2021
- Identification: Pennant number: ATH-81
- Status: Active

General characteristics
- Type: Training ship; Hospital ship
- Displacement: 4,300 tonnes (4,232 long tons) full load
- Length: 142.0 m (465 ft 11 in)
- Beam: 25.0 m (82 ft 0 in)
- Propulsion: Diesel engine; Electric motor; 2 x shafts
- Speed: 24 knots (44 km/h; 28 mph)
- Range: 6,479.5 nmi (12,000.0 km)
- Complement: 150
- Electronic warfare & decoys: MASS decoy launchers
- Armament: 1 × OTO Melara 76 mm; 1 × Bofors 40 mm gun
- Aviation facilities: Hangar and Helipad
- Notes: 400+ people; Lecture rooms; Dispensary; Surgery rooms; Sickbeds

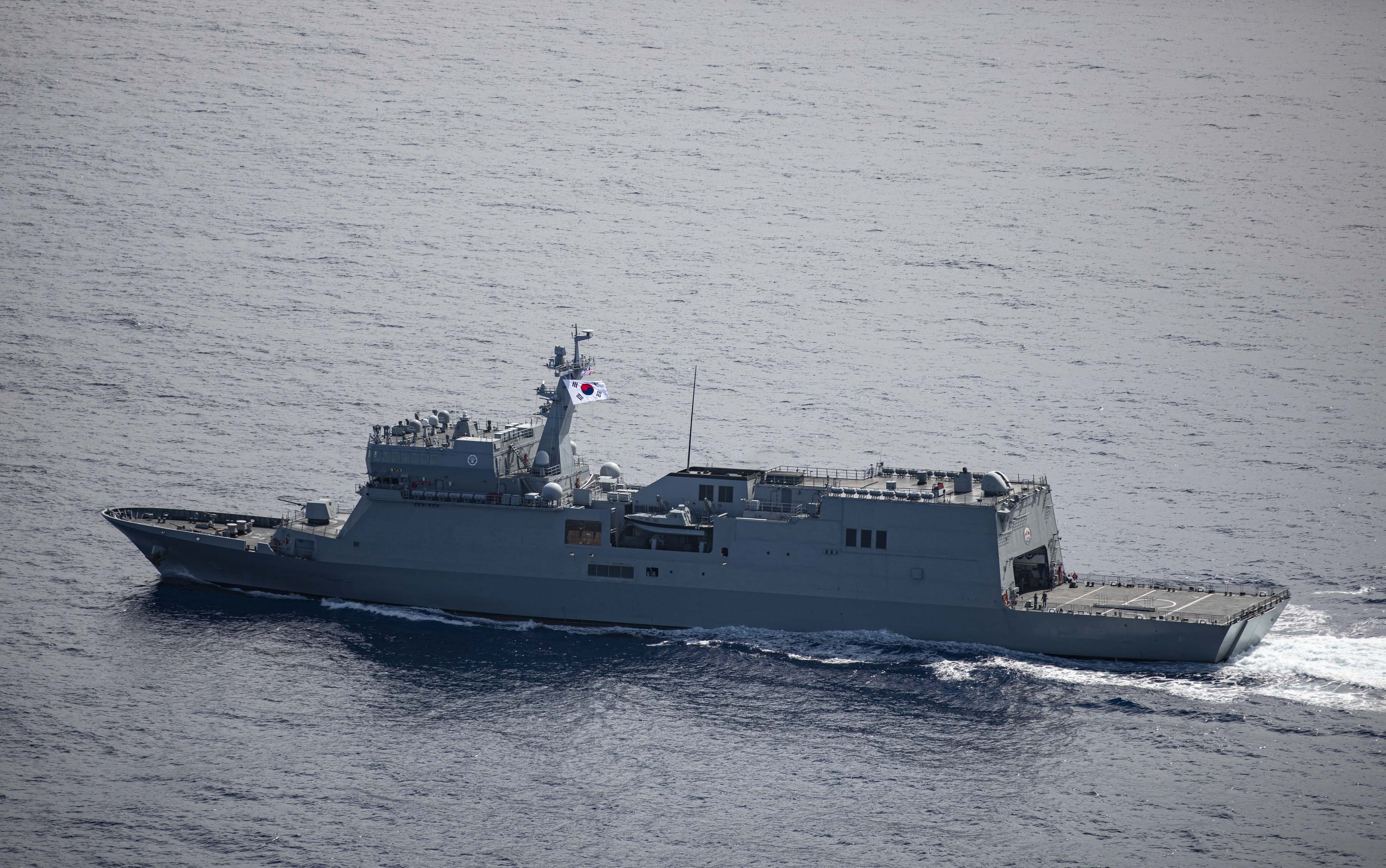

ROKS Hansando (ATH-81) is a helicopter training ship of the Republic of Korea Navy. She is named after Hansando.

== Development and design ==
On 23 October 2020, the Republic of Korea's Defense Acquisition Program Administration announced that Hyundai Heavy Industries had delivered Hansando to the Republic of Korea Navy.

She has a length of 142m with width of 25m, and is capable of holding a helicopter on her helipad. She carriers a single OTO 76mm, a 40mm gun and MASS decoy launchers. Displacement is about 4,300 tons and she has a crew of 150. She runs on both hybrid diesel and electric engines with 2 shafts and has a speed of 24 knots and range of 6,479 nautical miles. She is capable of having a hospital ship role, and is able to accommodate more than 400 people, surgery rooms, lecture rooms, dispensary and sickbeds.

== Construction and career ==
ROKS Hansando was laid down and launched on 16 November 2018 by Hyundai Heavy Industries and was commissioned on 5 April 2021.
