= ROKS Incheon (FFG-811) =

Incheon-class frigate

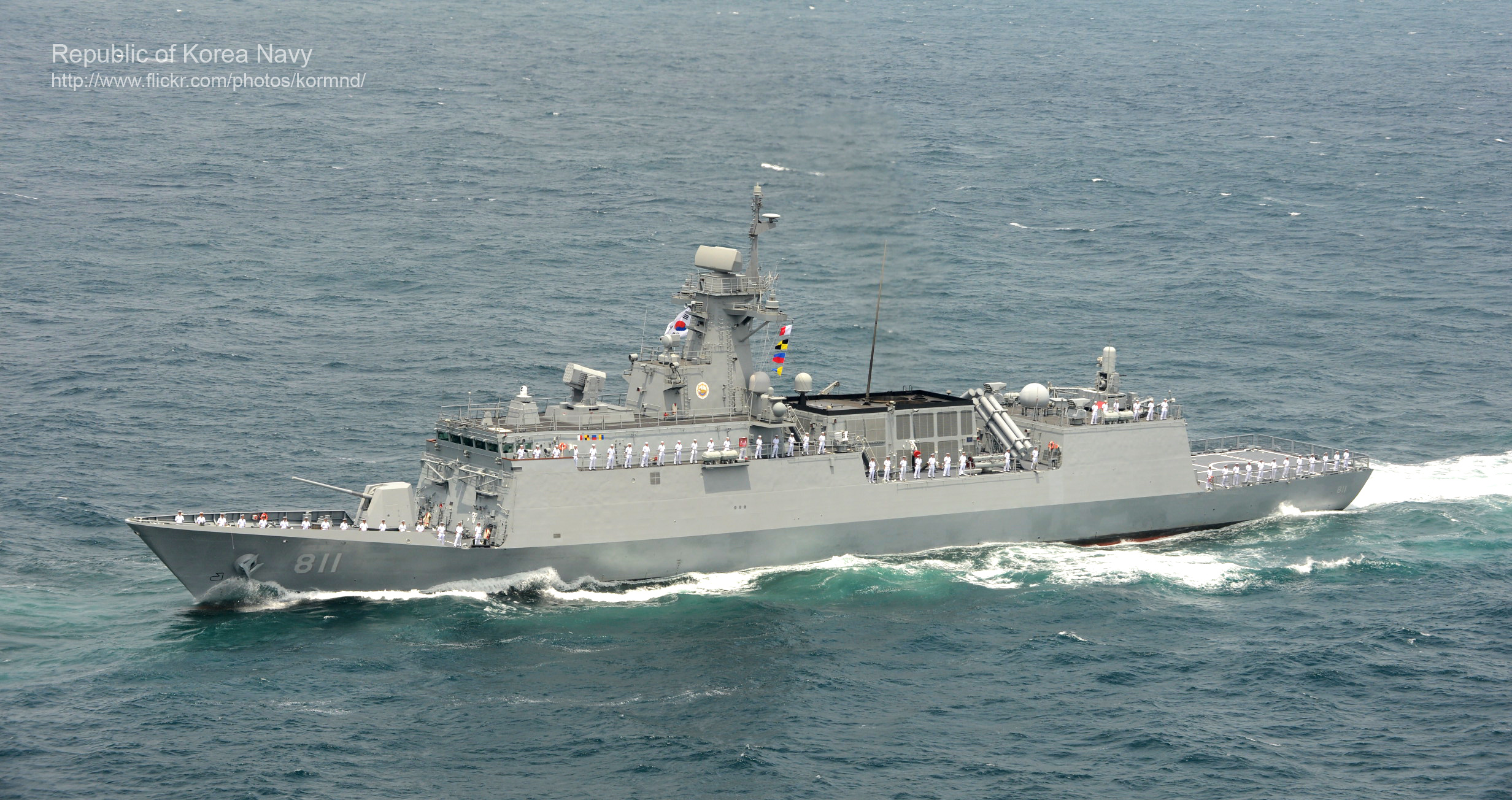
- ROKS Incheon underway on 26 June 2013

History

South Korea
- Name: Incheon; (인천)
- Namesake: Incheon
- Builder: Hyundai
- Launched: 29 April 2011
- Commissioned: 17 January 2013
- Identification: Pennant number: FFG-811
- Status: Active

General characteristics
- Class & type: Incheon-class frigate
- Displacement: 2,300 tonnes (2,264 long tons) light; 3,251 tonnes (3,200 long tons) full load
- Length: 114 m (374 ft)
- Beam: 14 m (46 ft)
- Draft: 4 m (13 ft)
- Propulsion: CODOG; 2 × MTU 12V 1163 TB83 diesel engine; 2 × GE LM2500 gas turbine
- Speed: 30 knots (56 km/h; 35 mph) (max); 18 knots (33 km/h; 21 mph) (cruising)
- Range: 4,500 nautical miles (8,000 km)
- Complement: 140
- Sensors & processing systems: SPS-550K air search 3D radar; SPG-540K fire control radar; SQS-240K hull-mounted sonar; SAQ-540K EOTS; Naval Shield Integrated Combat Management System
- Electronic warfare & decoys: LIG Nex1 SLQ-200(V)K Sonata electronic warfare suite; SLQ-261K torpedo acoustic counter measures; KDAGAIE Mk 2 decoy launchers
- Armament: 1 × 5 inch (127 mm)/L62 caliber Mk 45 Mod 4 naval gun; 1 × 20 mm Phalanx CIWS; 2 × triple torpedo tubes for K745 Blue Shark torpedo; 1 × RAM Block 1 CIWS; 8 × SSM-700K Haeseong Anti-ship Missile in quad configuration; 8 × Haeryong Tactical Land Attack Missile in quad configuration
- Aircraft carried: Super Lynx or AW159 helicopter
- Aviation facilities: Flight deck and enclosed hangar for one medium-lift helicopter

ROKS Incheon (FFG-811) is the lead ship of the Incheon-class frigate in the Republic of Korea Navy. She is named after the city, Incheon.

== Development ==
In the early 1990s, the Korean government plan for the construction of next generation coastal ships named Frigate 2000 was scrapped due to the 1997 Asian financial crisis. But the decommissioning of the Gearing-class destroyers and the aging fleet of Ulsan-class frigates, the plan was revived as the Future Frigate eXperimental, also known as FFX in the early 2000s.

The Republic of Korea Navy initially wanted twenty-four 3000 ton frigates to replace the Ulsan, Pohang and Donghae-class coastal fleet of 37 ships. It was later decided that six 2700 ton ships will be constructed for the first batch. In 2008, the plan was further downgraded to 2300 tons when president Lee Myung-bak took office, with the number of ships for the first batch down to six. 8 ships are planned for the second batch of FFX with the final goal of 20-22 frigates.

== Construction and career ==
ROKS Incheon was launched on 29 April 2011 by Hyundai Heavy Industries and commissioned on 17 January 2013.

She participated in IMDEX Asia 2015. On 20 May, she was moored at Changi Naval Base, Singapore.

== Gallery ==
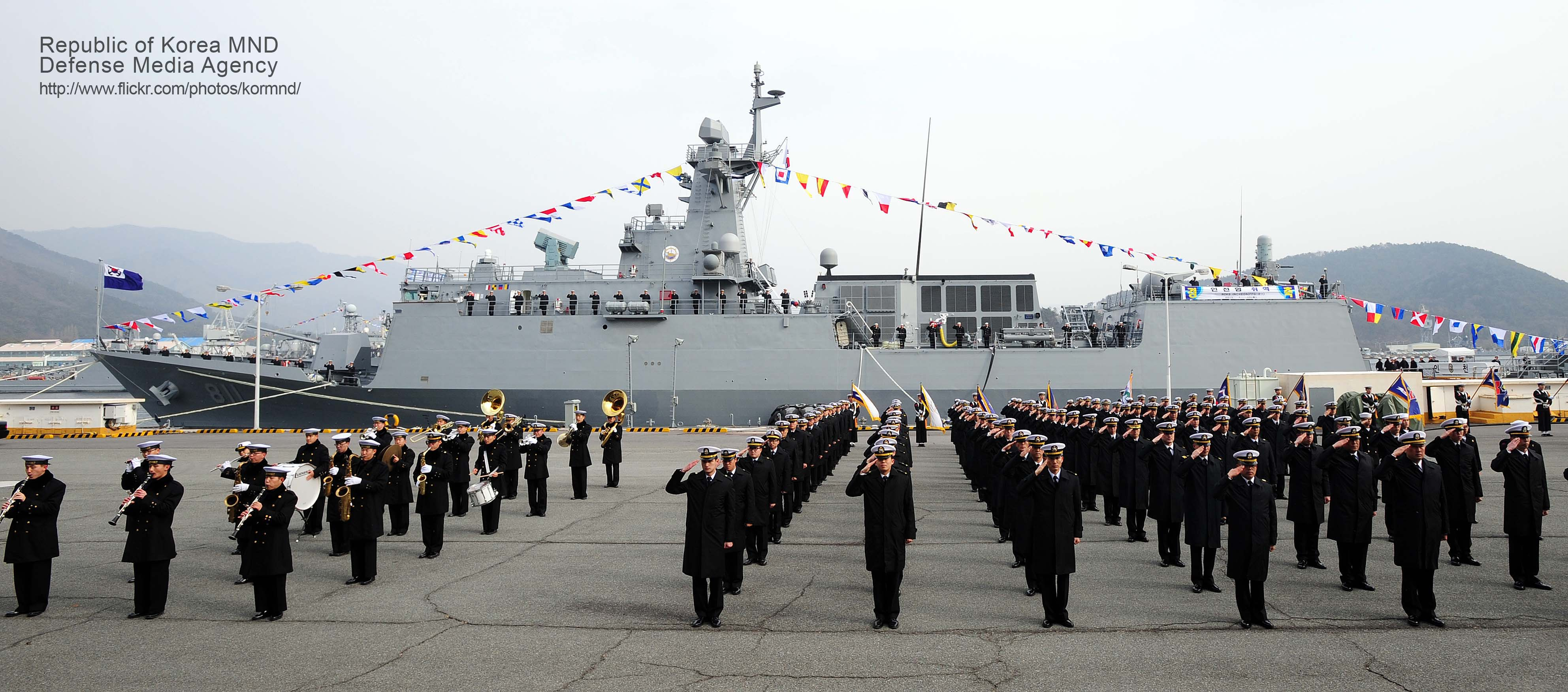
ROKS Incheon on 17 January 2013

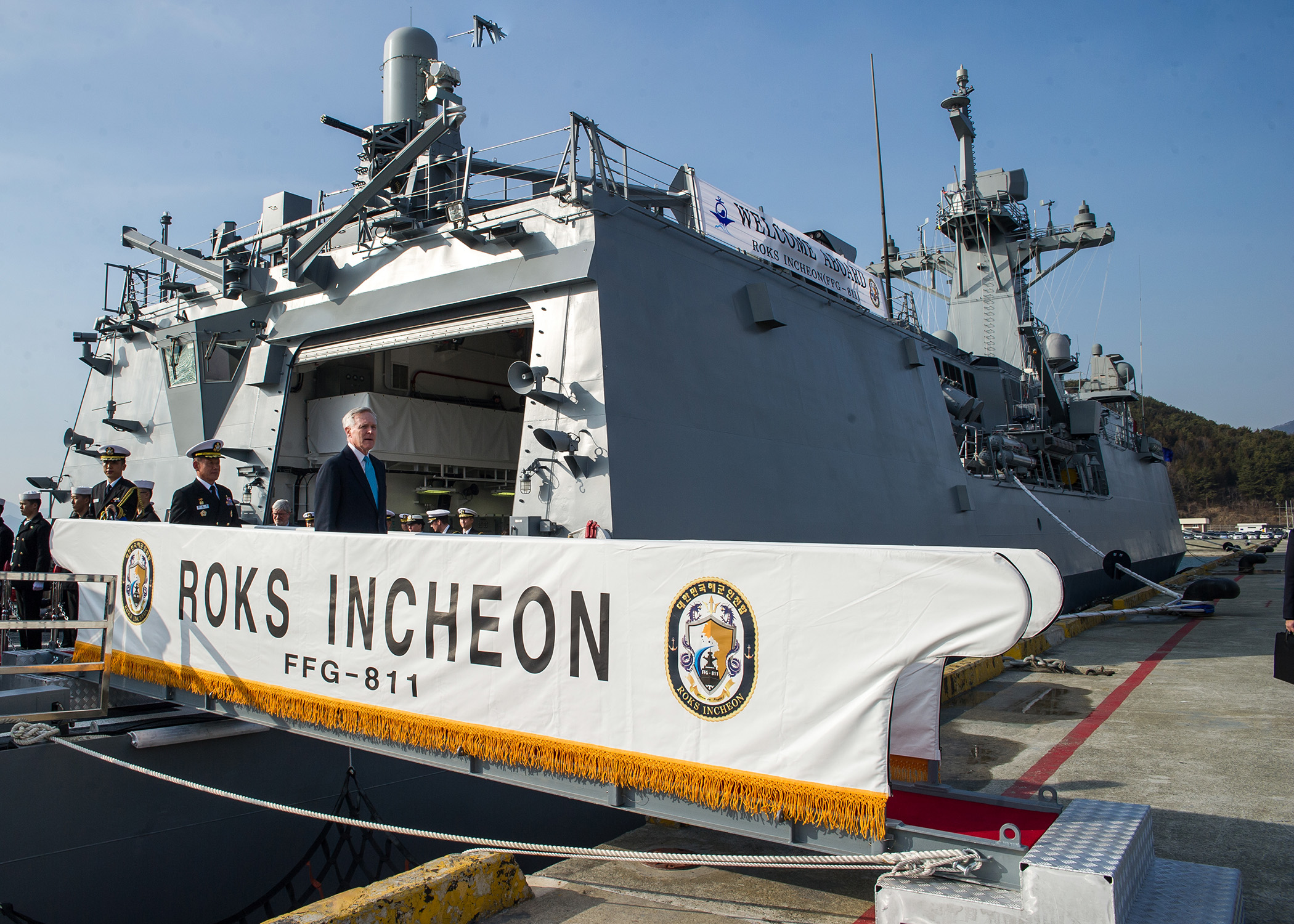
ROKS Incheon on 19 February 2013

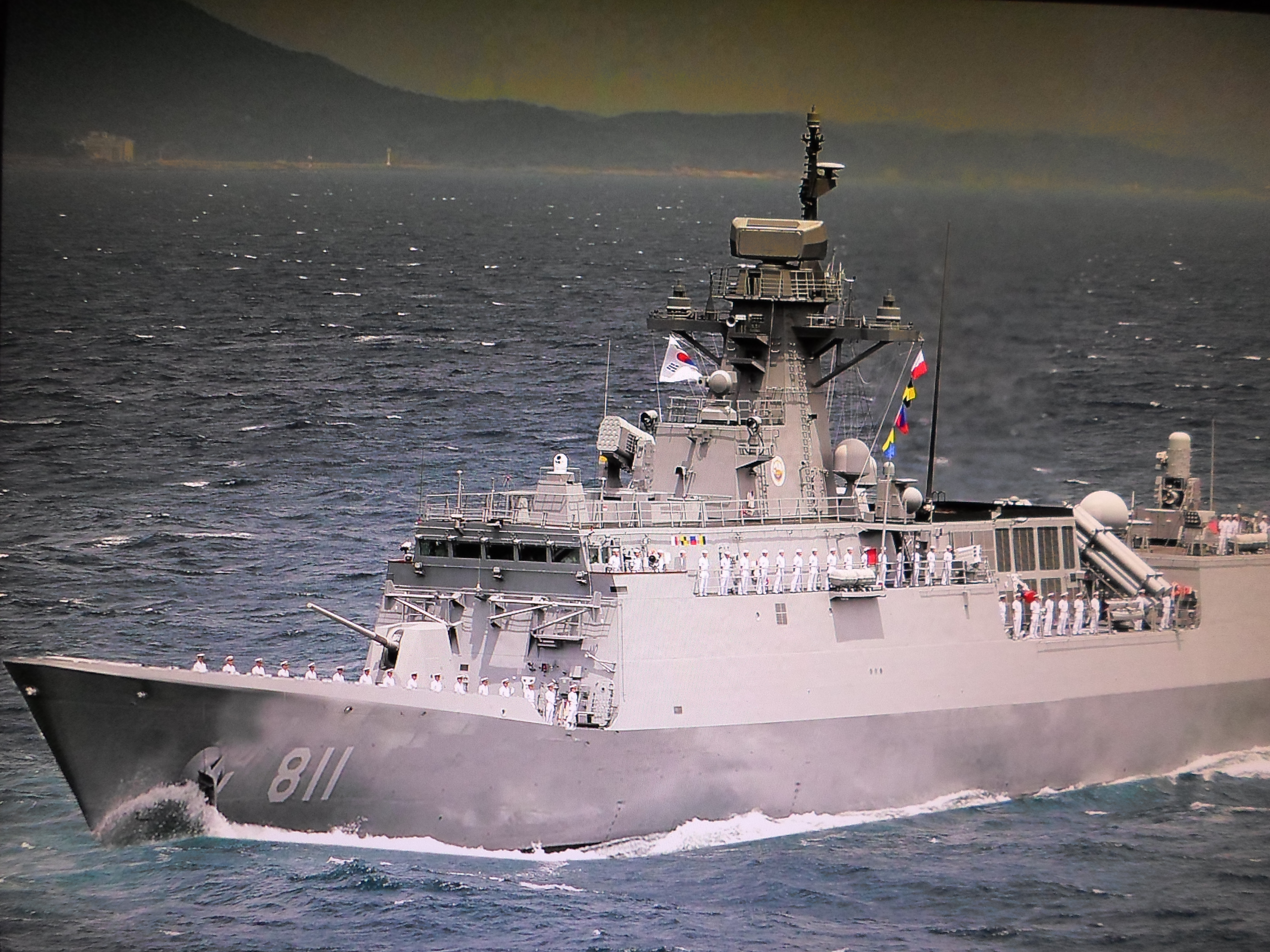
ROKS Incheon underway on 22 October 2013
