= ROKS Seoul (FFG-821) =

Daegu-class frigate

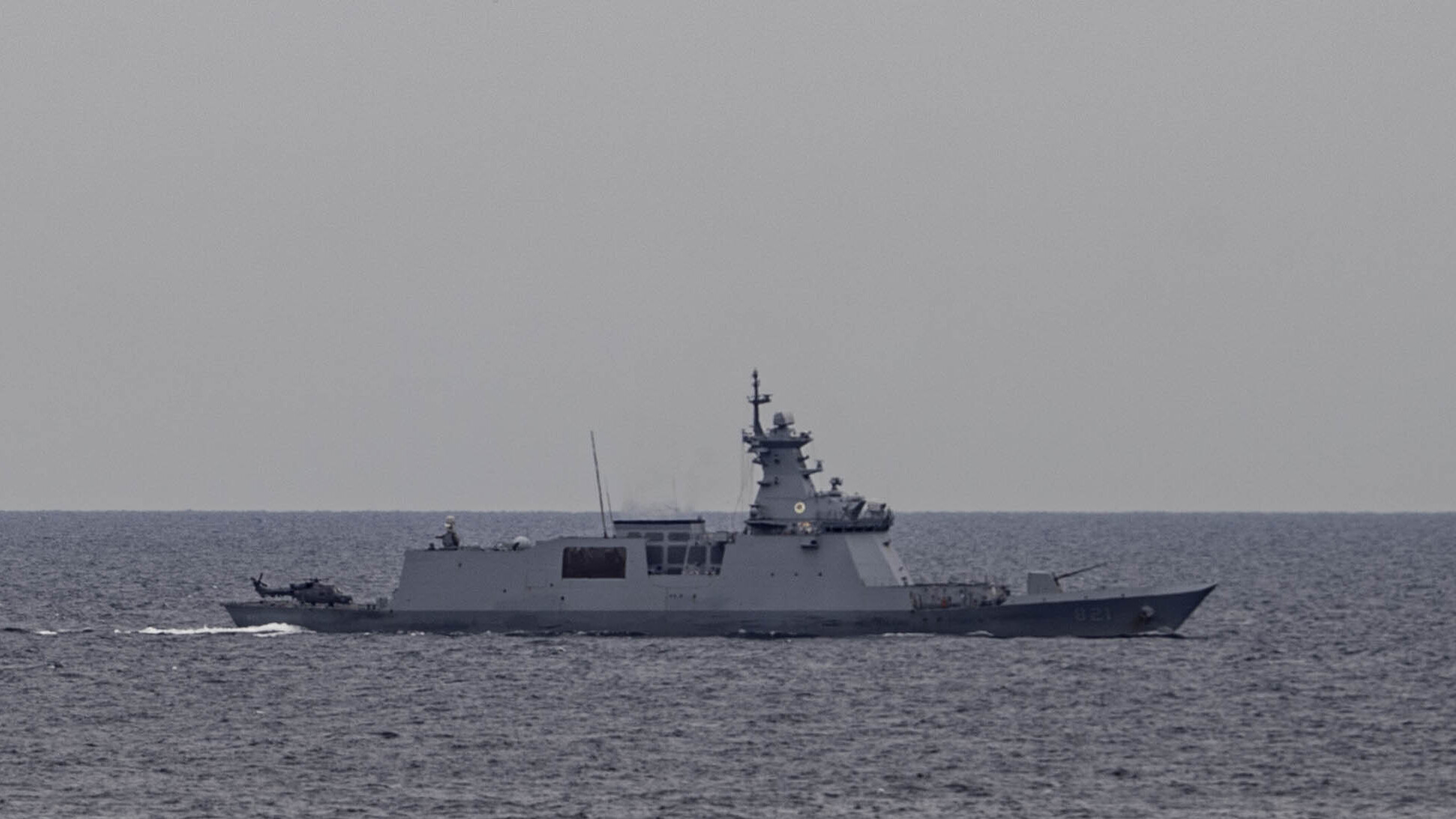

History

South Korea
- Name: Seoul; (서울)
- Namesake: Seoul
- Builder: Hyundai
- Launched: 11 November 2019
- Commissioned: July 2021
- Identification: Pennant number: FFG-821
- Status: Active

General characteristics
- Class & type: Daegu-class frigate
- Displacement: 2,800 tonnes (2,756 long tons) light; 3,592 tonnes (3,535 long tons) full load
- Length: 122 m (400 ft)
- Beam: 14 m (46 ft)
- Draft: 4 m (13 ft)
- Propulsion: Combined diesel-electric or gas; 1 × Rolls-Royce MT30 gas turbine; 4 × MTU 12V 4000 M53B diesel engine; 2 × Leonardo DRS electric motors
- Speed: 30 knots (56 km/h; 35 mph) (max); 18 knots (33 km/h; 21 mph) (cruising)
- Range: 4,500 nautical miles (8,000 km)
- Complement: 140
- Sensors & processing systems: SPS-550K air search 3D radar; SPG-540K fire control radar; SQS-240K hull-mounted sonar; SQR-250K towed array sonar system; SAQ-540K EOTS; Hanwha Systems SAQ-600K IRSTs; Naval Shield Integrated Combat Management System
- Electronic warfare & decoys: LIG Nex1 SLQ-200(V)K Sonata electronic warfare suite; SLQ-261K torpedo acoustic counter measures; MASS decoy launchers
- Armament: 1 × 5 inch (127 mm)/L62 caliber Mk 45 Mod 4 naval gun; 1 × 20 mm Phalanx CIWS; 2 × triple torpedo tubes for K745 Blue Shark torpedo; 8 × SSM-700K Haeseong Anti-ship Missile; 16-cell K-VLS for: Haegung K-SAAM quadpacked in 4 per cell; Haeryong VL-Tactical Land Attack Missiles; K-ASROC Red Shark
- Aircraft carried: Super Lynx or AW159 helicopter
- Aviation facilities: Flight deck and enclosed hangar for one medium-lift helicopter

ROKS Seoul (FFG-821) is the third ship of the Daegu-class frigate in the Republic of Korea Navy. She is named after the capital, Seoul.

== Development ==
Daegu-class is an improved variant of the Incheon-class frigate. Modifications to the Incheon-class include a TB-250K towed array sonar system and a 16-cell Korean Vertical Launching System (K-VLS) that is able to deploy the K-SAAM, Hong Sang Eo anti-submarine missile, and Haeryong tactical land attack cruise missiles.

The hull design is generally based on that of the Incheon-class. However, as a part of weapon system modifications, the superstructure has been significantly changed. The hangar and a helicopter deck on stern has been enlarged to support the operation of a 10-ton helicopter.

== Construction and career ==
ROKS Seoul was launched on 11 November 2019 by Hyundai Heavy Industries and expected to be commissioned in 2021.
