= List of Republic of Korea Navy weaponry =

The Republic of Korea Navy, the Defense Acquisition Program Administration (DAPA), and the Agency for Defense Development (ADD) of South Korea have been developing naval weaponry with local defense companies.

== Notable weaponry ==
Name	Type	Introduced	Versions	Adapted for use	Manufacturer	Notes
Torpedoes
Mark 44	lightweight torpedo (324 mm)	1970s	-	-	General Electric	Retired
KT-75 (Sangeo)	lightweight torpedo (324 mm)	1970s	-	-	-	Copy of Mark 44 (Designed 1975-76)
K-744	lightweight torpedo (324 mm)	1986	-	FF, Lynx/Super Lynx, P-3	LIG NEX1 (formerly LG Precision Co. Ltd.)	The ADD had commenced negotiations with Honeywell for the co-development
SUT (Surface and Underwater Target)	heavyweight torpedo (533 mm)	1992	Mod 2	-	AEG	Export version of DM1 Seeschlange
Baeksangeo (White Shark)	heavyweight torpedo (483 mm)	2000	K731	Chang Bogo class	LIG NEX1	-
Cheongsangeo (Blue Shark)	lightweight torpedo (324 mm)	2005	K745	DDG, DDH-I/II, FF, Lynx/Super Lynx, P-3	LIG NEX1	Indigenous system
Hongsangeo (Red Shark)	anti-submarine rocket (ASROC)	2011	n/a	-	LIG NEX1	-
Missiles
MBDA Exocet	anti-ship missile	1975	MM38	FF	MBDA Missile Systems	Retired
Harpoon	anti-ship missile	1977	RGM-84A/C/D/G	DDH-I, DDH-II, FF, Chang Bogo class	Boeing	Slowly being retired
MBDA Sea Skua (Flying Shark)	Helicopter Launched Light Anti-Ship Missile	1996	-	Lynx/Super Lynx	MBDA Missile Systems	-
Sea Sparrow	surface-to-air missile	1998	RIM-7	DDH-I	-	-
RAM (Rolling Airframe Missile)	surface-to-air missile	2002	RIM-116	DDG, DDH-II, LPH	LIG NEX1	Licensed production
Haeseong (C-Star)	anti-ship missile	2006	SSM-700K	DDG, DDH-II, FFG-I/II, PKG	LIG NEX1	Developed 1996-2003
Haeryong (Sea Dragon)	tactical ship-to-land missile	2016	-	FFG-I/II	LIG NEX1	Variant of Haeseong anti-ship missile
130mm guided rocket	anti-ship missile	2017	-	PKMR	LIG NEX1	-
Hyeonmu III	cruise missile	2008	Hyeonmu IIIA	-	LIG NEX1	Hyeonmu IIIB & Hyeonmu IIIC under development
SM-2	surface-to-air missile	-	RIM-66	DDG, DDH-II	-	-
SM-6	anti-ballistic missile	2016	-	-	-	
Others
KDCOM-I, II	Combat management system	-	-	DDH-I/II	Samsung	Samsung had commenced negotiations with BAE Systems for the co-development
Nobong	40mm twin naval gun	1980s	40L70K	PKG, LST-I/II, MLS-I	Doosan DST (formerly Daewoo Heavy Industries)	-
Mk45 (5-Inch/54-caliber)	127mm naval gun	-	KMK45 (Mod 4)	DDG, DDH-II, FF	Hyundai Wia (formerly Kia Special Steel Co., Ltd)	Licensed production

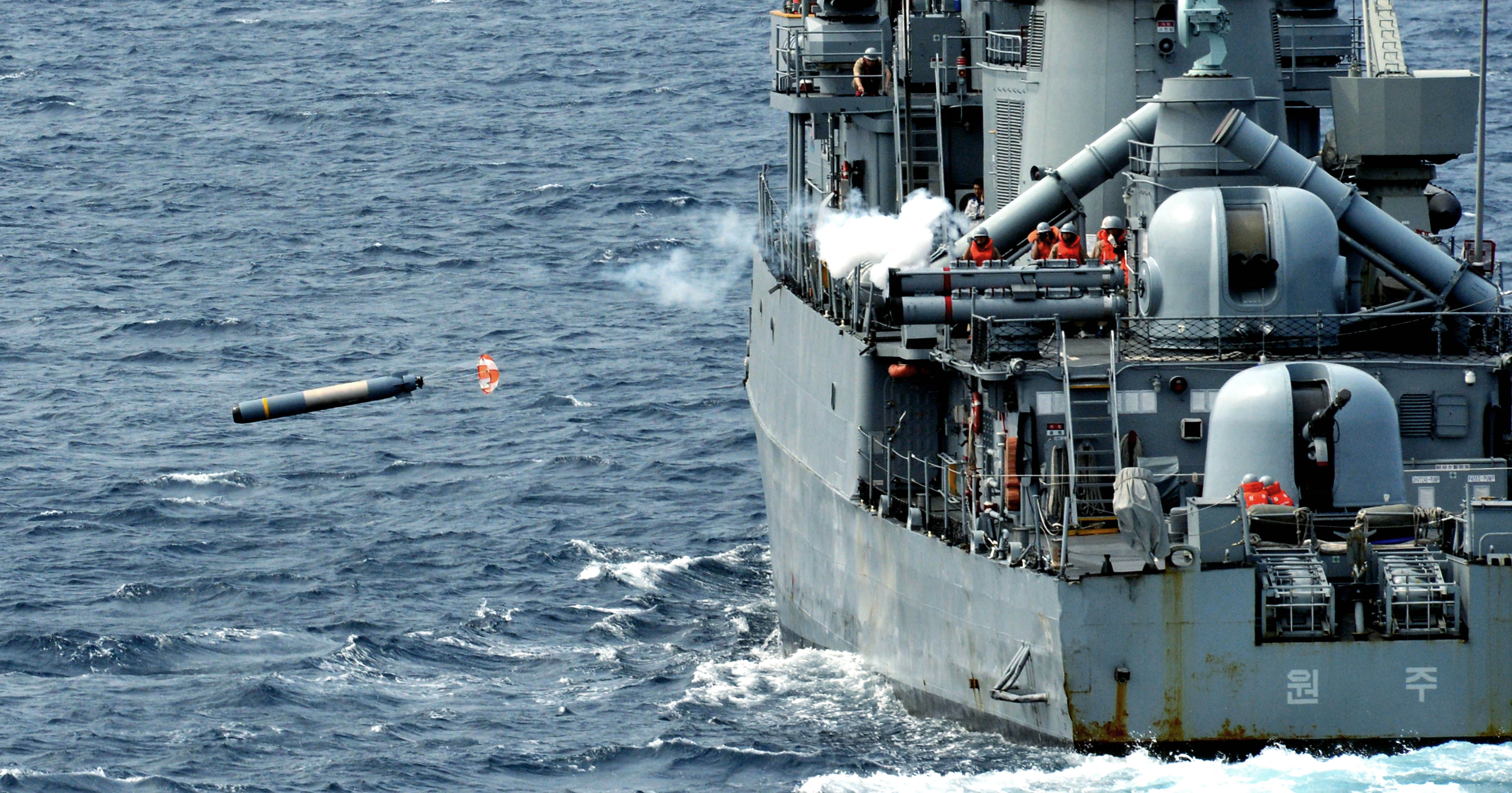
ROKS Wonju (PCC 769) firing the Cheongsangeo torpedo

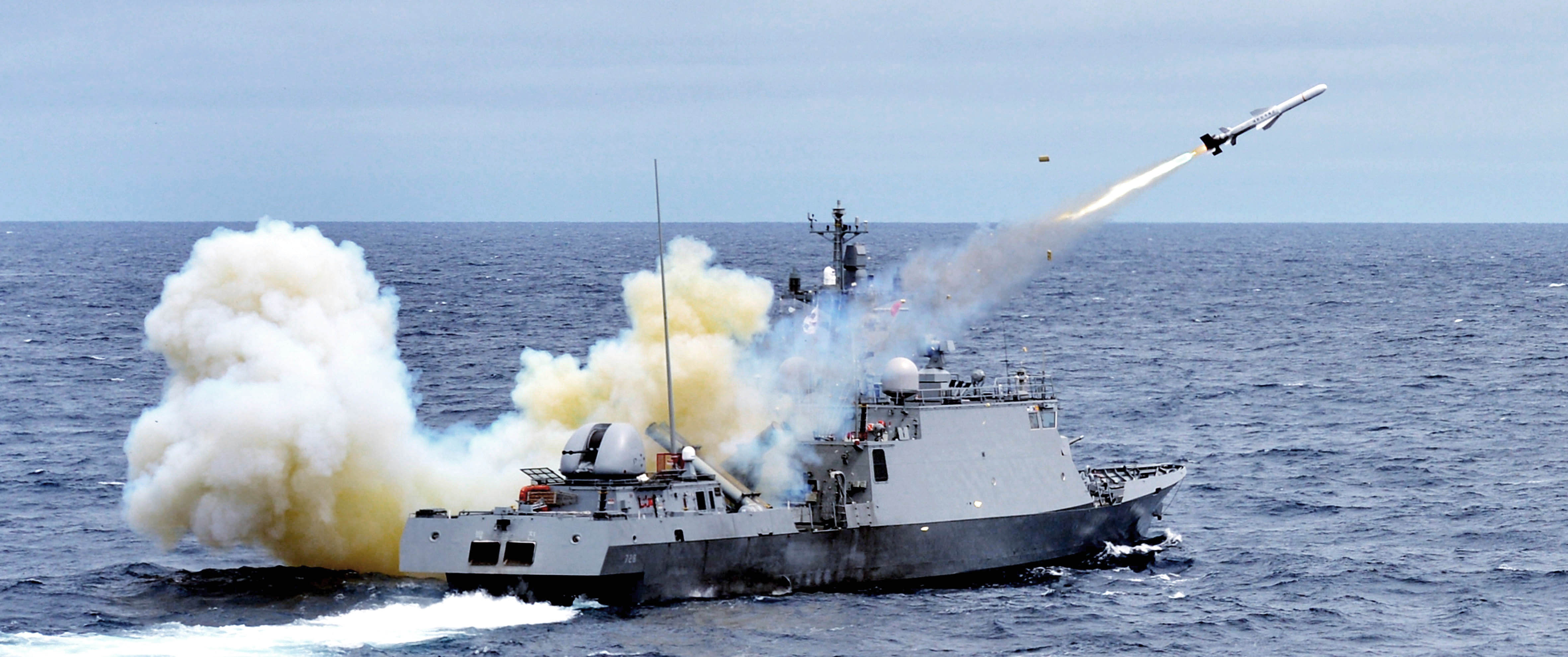
Firing the Haeseong anti-ship missile from a Yoon Youngha-class fast missile craft
