= ROKS Pohang =

ROKS Pohang is the name of two Republic of Korea Navy warships:

- ROKS Pohang (PCC-756), a Pohang-class corvette from 1984 to 2009
- ROKS Pohang (FFG-825), a Daegu-class frigate which is under construction
