= ROKS Daejeon =

ROKS Daejeon (also transliterated as Taejon) is the name of the following ships of the Republic of Korea Navy, named for the city of Daejeon:

- ROKS Daejeon (DD-919), formerly USS New, a Chungbuk-class destroyer (originally Gearing class) transferred in 1977 and decommissioned in 2001
- ROKS Daejeon (FFG-823), a Daegu-class frigate commissioned in 2023
