= ROKS Daegu =

ROKS Daegu is the name of two Republic of Korea Navy warships:

- ROKS Daegu (DD-917), a Daegu-class destroyer from 1973 to 1994.
- ROKS Daegu (FFG-818), a Daegu-class frigate from 2018 to present.
