= Chungnam-class frigate =

Naval ship class

Class overview
- Name: Chungnam class
- Builders: Hyundai Heavy Industries; SK Oceanplant
- Operators: Republic of Korea Navy
- Preceded by: Daegu class
- Built: 2022-present
- Planned: 6
- Building: 2
- Completed: 4
- Active: 2

General characteristics
- Type: Guided missile frigate
- Displacement: 4,300 t (4,232 long tons) full load
- Length: 129 m (423 ft 3 in)
- Beam: 14.8 m (48 ft 7 in)
- Propulsion: Combined diesel–electric or gas; 1 × Rolls-Royce MT30 gas turbine; MTU diesel engines; 2 × shafts
- Armament: 1 × 5-inch (127 mm)/L62 caliber Mk 45 Mod 4 naval gun; 1 × CIWS-II; 2 × triple torpedo tubes for K745 Blue Shark torpedo; 16-cell K-VLS for: Haegung K-SAAM quadpacked in 4 per cell; Haeryong VL-Tactical Land Attack Missiles

The Chungnam-class frigate is a class of frigates of the Republic of Korea Navy (ROKN). The Chungnam class is based on the preceding Daegu class. Which in turn is based on the Incheon class, and has otherwise been referred to as the Incheon-class batch III, FFX-III, or FFG-III.

Confusingly, the FFX Batch III is sometimes called the Ulsan class. The Ulsan class, were the predecessors to the FFX program, preceding the Incheon-class (FFX-I class). Ulsan is also the name of FFX Batch IV.

== History ==
The first ship was launched in April 2023.

Construction of the second ship started on 27 July 2023 with a steel cutting ceremony at the SK Oceanplant.

== Features ==
The Chungnam class is reportedly capable of intercepting up to eight incoming missiles.

== Export ==
The Chungnam-class frigate was derivatived as the HDF-4000TH, offered by Hyundai Heavy Industries to the Royal Thai Navy. It is equipped with 2 8-cell Barak missiles for Area defense and Point defense, Blue Spear anti ship missile and a SPY-400K fixed-phased array radar.

== Ships in the class ==
Name	Pennant number	Builder	Laid down	Launched	Commissioned	Status
ROKS Chungnam	FFG-828	Hyundai Heavy Industries	25 April 2022	10 April 2023	24 December 2024	Active
ROKS Gyeoungbuk	FFG-829	SK Oceanplant	1 April 2024	20 June 2025	19 June 2026	Active
ROKS Jeonnam	FFG-831	SK Oceanplant	September 2024	25 November 2025	December 2026 (planned)	Launched
ROKS Jeju	FFG-832	SK Oceanplant		29 April 2026	June 2027 (planned)	Launched
ROKS Pyeongtaek	FFG-833	Hanwha Ocean		18 November 2026	December 2027 (planned)	Launched
TBD	FFG-835	Hanwha Ocean			June 2028 (planned)	Under construction

== See also ==
- List of frigate classes in service

=== Equivalent frigates of the same era ===
- Mogami class
- FF(X)
- Tamandaré class
- Miguel Malvar class
- Istanbul class
- FDI
- Baden-Württemberg class
