= ROKS Donghae =

ROKS Donghae is the name of two Republic of Korea Navy warships:

- ROKS Donghae (PCC-751), a Donghae-class corvette from 1983 to 2009.
- ROKS Donghae (FFG-822), a Daegu-class frigate which is expected to be commissioned in 2021.
