= ROKS Gyeongnam =

At least two ships of the Republic of Korea Navy have been named ROKS Gyeongnam;

- ROKS Gyeongnam (APD-822), a Crosley-class high speed transport acquired from the US in 1959 and decommissioned in 2000.
- ROKS Gyeongnam (FFG-819), a Daegu-class frigate commissioned in 2021
