= Prettl =

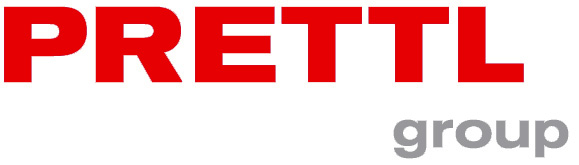
- Type: The logo of the Prettl group
- Industry: Gesellschaft mit beschränkter Haftung
- Founded: 1953; 73 years ago
- Headquarters: Pfullingen, Baden-Württemberg
- Area served: West Germany, Germany
- Key people: Erhardt Prettl, Rolf Prettl, Dr. Peter Schaumann, Matthias Weber, Willi Prettl.
- Products: automotive industry, energy, electronics, components & systems and strategic build-up
- Revenue: 2500 million Euro (as of 2022)
- Number of employees: 21000
- Subsidiaries: conglomerate
- Website: https://www.prettl.com/index.html

Prettl Produktions Holding GmbH is a German group of companies from Pfullingen, which is active in the five following segments; the automotive industry, energy, electronics, components & systems and strategic build-up.

According to the principle of company founder Franz W. Prettl, the group does not want to be dependent on any market. The Prettl Group currently has more than 21000 employees and sales of around €2500 million in more than 25 countries.

Prettl is privately owned and is managed by the brothers Rolf and Erhardt Prettl.

In 2007, Prettl became the first German company in North Korea to acquire land in the special economic zone of Kaesong. The location in the controversial Kaesong province was not built after the incident with the ROKS Cheonan corvette. Instead, the company is investing in building a production facility in Vietnam.

Prettl is a sponsor of the Ducati Pramac team since 2017.

== Group structure ==
The Prettl Group is managed as a holding company and is divided into 5 segments: Automotive, Electronics, Energy, Components & System and Strategic build-up. The parent company is Prettl Produktions Holding GmbH. Independent companies within the group are: Prettl Produktions Holding GmbH

- Prettl Beteiligungs Holding GmbH
- Prettl Foundation
- Prettl Electronics GmbH
- Prettl Electronics Lübeck GmbH
- Prettl metal components GmbH
- Prettl Home Appliance Solutions GmbH
- Endress Elektrogerätebau GmbH
- Jupiter food processors GmbH
- Cherry GmbH
- Kurz Kasch Inc.
- Lesswire GmbH
- PAS Management Holding GmbH
- Protech GmbH
- Refu Elektronik GmbH
