= Solid-fuel space launch vehicle =

South Korean orbital launch vehicle

Mir
- Function: Small-lift launch vehicle
- Manufacturer: Agency for Defense Development
- Country of origin: South Korea

Size
- Height: -
- Diameter: -
- Mass: -
- Stages: 4

Launch history
- Status: In development
- Launch sites: Anheung Proving Ground; Barge, waters south of Jeju Island
- Total launches: 3 (test vehicles)
- Success(es): 3 (test vehicles)
- First flight: 30 March 2022 (TV1)
- Last flight: 4 December 2023 (TV2) (most recent)

Mir (Korean: 미르), commonly referred to by the abbreviation GYŪB (Korean: Goche Yeonlyo Uju Balsache or 고체연료 우주발사체), is an orbital booster developed by the state-run Agency for Defense Development (ADD). It is based on solid propellant stages, with a liquid-fuel post‑boost stage (PBS), designed to deploy small satellites—particularly synthetic aperture radar (SAR) reconnaissance payloads—into low Earth orbit as part of the country's independent space-based surveillance capability.

ADD plans the first launch of a complete version of the launcher, capable of placing a one-ton satellite into a sun-synchronous orbit, in 2027. By 2032, the military expects to have a version capable of placing 7 tonnes into a sun-synchronous orbit and 3.7 tonnes into a geostationary transfer orbit.

== Technical details ==
The rocket has three solid‑fuel stages, followed by a liquid‑fueled fourth "post‑boost" stage (PBS) to enable precise payload deployment. The first stage is mentioned to produce "a thrust that is one-and-a-half times stronger than North Korea’s solid-fuel engines", or around 245 tones. The second stage produces 75 tons of thrust. The GYŪB‑TV2 version, launched in December 2023, had an estimated take-off thrust of 170 tonnes with the capacity to place 700 kilograms in low orbit.

GYŪB orbital launcher versions
Version	Year	1st stage	2nd stage	3rd stage	4th stage	Thrust (t)	Payload to sun-synchronous orbit (t)	Payload to geostationary transfer orbit (t)
GYŪB TV2	2023	Active	-	Active	Active	170	.7	
GYŪB	2027	Active	Active	Active	Active		1	
unnamed	2032						7	3.7

== Flight history ==
Two suborbital launches of a version called TV1 (Test Vehicle 1), comprising only the last three stages, were carried out in 2022 from Anhueng. TV2 is an incomplete version of the final launch vehicle, consisting of only the 1st, 3rd, and 4th stages. It was launched on December 4, 2023, from a barge off Jeju Island.

- March 2022: GYŪB‑TV1 (1) - First suborbital test using a live stage 2, a inert stage 3, and a live PBS.
- December 2022: GYŪB‑TV1 (1)- Second suborbital flight with live stage 2, 3 and PBS.
- December 4, 2023: GYŪB‑TV2 - First orbital launch, using stage 1, stage 3 and PBS, successfully placing a 100 kg SAR satellite ("Doory‑Sat" built by Hanwha Systems) into a 650 km orbit.
