= Korean Air KUS-FS =

South Korean unmanned aerial vehicle

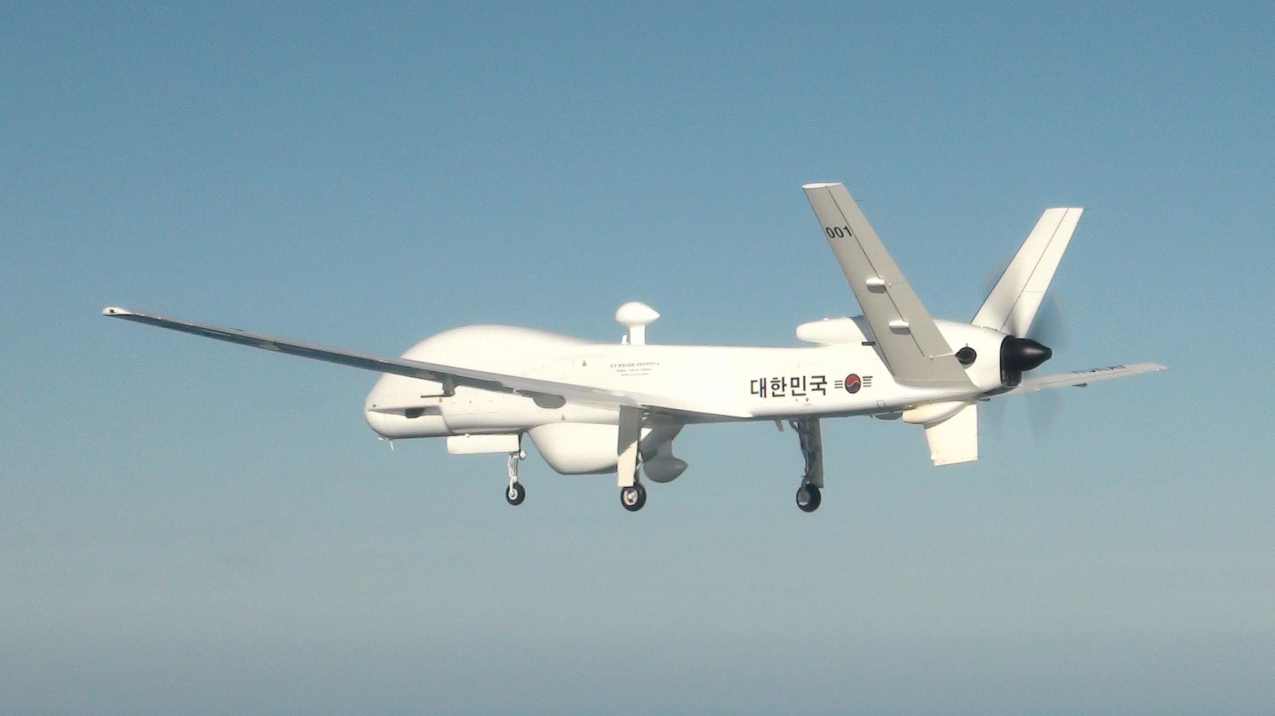
- KUS-FS during flight testing

General information
- Type: Medium-altitude long-endurance UAV
- National origin: South Korea
- Manufacturer: Korean Air Aerospace Division
- Designer: Agency for Defense Development; Korean Air Aerospace Division
- Primary user: Republic of Korea Air Force (intended)

History
- Manufactured: 2024–present
- First flight: February 2012

The Korean Air KUS-FS (Korean Unmanned System–Flight Strategic), or MUAV (Medium-altitude Unmanned Aerial Vehicle) is a medium-altitude long-endurance unmanned aerial vehicle (MALE UAV) developed by the Agency for Defense Development (ADD) and Korean Air Aerospace Division (KAL-ASD). Development started in 2008, with its first flight occurring in 2012 and development concluding in March 2022. It was developed for the South Korean Air Force's Group 5 UAV system. Previously known as the MUAV (Medium-Altitude UAV), the KUS-FS is in the same class as the US-built General Atomics MQ-9 Reaper UAV.

== Design and development ==
The aircraft is 13 m (43 ft) long with a 25 m (82 ft) wingspan and has a height of 3 m (9.8 ft). Powered by a modified 1,200 hp turboprop engine based on the Samsung Techwin SS-760K turbojet engine developed for the SSM-700K C-Star anti-ship missile, it has an endurance in excess of 24 hours while flying at a service ceiling of 13,000 m (43,000 ft), from where its surveillance systems were accurate enough to identify a specific seat within the Seoul Sports Complex 130 km (81 mi) away. It is capable of scanning ground targets 110 km (68 mi) away from an altitude of 10–13 km (33,000–45,000 ft). There are four underwing hardpoints which can be used to carry munitions.

The expected delivery time of the KUS-FS was expected to be from the fourth quarter of 2023 to the first quarter of 2024, and the ROKAF plans to procure two to three complete MUAV systems, totaling about 10 air vehicles, with introduction planned by 2025 and deliveries completed in 2028. Production began in January 2024.

== Specifications ==
Data from Korean Air Aerospace, Hanwha Systems, and LIG Nex1

General characteristics

- Crew: Unmanned
- Length: 13 m (42 ft 8 in)
- Wingspan: 25 m (82 ft 0 in)
- Height: 3 m (9 ft 10 in)
- Max takeoff weight: 5,750 kg (12,677 lb)
- Powerplant: 1 × Hanwha Aerospace turboprop 1,200 hp (890 kW), 24.46 kN (5,500 lbf) thrust (Modified based on Samsung Techwin SS-760K turbojet engine, 4.67 kN (1,050 lbf) thrust)

Performance

- Maximum speed: 360 km/h (220 mph, 190 kn)
- Range: 500 km (310 mi, 270 nmi)
- Endurance: 24 hours
- Service ceiling: 13,716 m (45,000 ft)

Avionics

- Electro-optics (EO) by Hanwha Systems
- Infrared (IR) by Hanwha Systems
- NexSAR Synthetic-aperture radar (SAR) by LIG Nex1
- Line of sight (LOS) data link by LIG Nex1
- Satellite data link by LIG Nex1
- GPS anti-jamming device by LIG Nex1
- Starfire MXF-4058 U/VHF-AM Radio by BAE Systems
- Integrated mission computer by LIG Nex1
- Forward-looking infrared (FLIR) by LIG Nex1
- Radio altimeter (RALT) by LIG Nex1
- Flight control computer (FLCC) by LIG Nex1
