= ROKS Pohang (PCC-756) =

Pohang-class corvette

Coordinates: 36.0411943°N 129.3722864°E

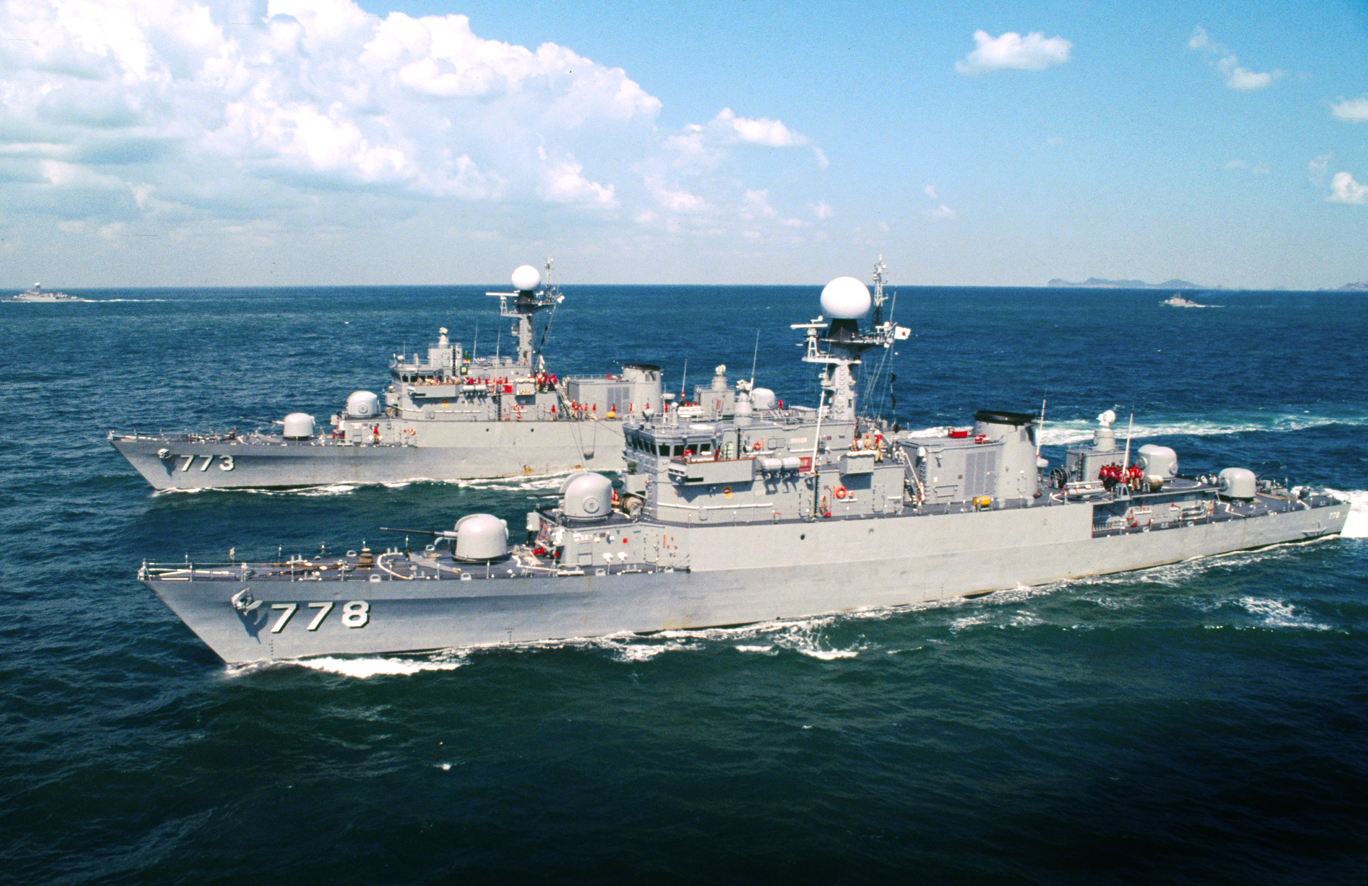
- Pohang-class corvette

History

South Korea
- Name: Pohang; (포항)
- Namesake: Pohang
- Builder: Hanjin, Busan
- Launched: 7 February 1984
- Commissioned: 18 December 1984
- Decommissioned: 30 June 2009
- Identification: Pennant number: PCC-756
- Fate: Museum ship in Pohang

General characteristics
- Class & type: Pohang-class corvette
- Displacement: 1,220 tons
- Length: 289.7 ft (88 m)
- Beam: 33 ft (10 m)
- Draft: 2.9 ft (0.88 m)
- Installed power: 2 × MTU 6V396 TC52 diesel generators
- Propulsion: Combined diesel or gas (CODOG) arrangement: 2 × MTU 12V956 TB82 diesel engines producing combined total of 6,260 shp (4,670 kW); 1 × General Electric LM2500 PB gas turbines generating 27,820 shp (20,700 kW)
- Speed: 32 knots (59 km/h; 37 mph) maximum
- Range: 4,000 nmi (7,400 km; 4,600 mi) at 15 knots (28 km/h; 17 mph) using diesel engines
- Endurance: 20 days
- Boats & landing craft carried: 2 × RHIB
- Crew: 118
- Sensors & processing systems: X-band & S-band navigational radars; Raytheon AN/SPS-64(V)5B surface search radar; Signaal (Thales Nederland) WM-28 Fire Control System; Signaal (Thales Nederland) LIOD optronic director; Raytheon AN/SQS-58 hull mounted passive/active sonar
- Electronic warfare & decoys: 2 × Loral Hycor Mk 34 RBOC Chaff and Decoy Launching System
- Armament: 2 × Oto Melara 76 mm/62 caliber Compact naval guns; 2 × Otobreda 40mm L/70 twin naval guns; 2 × Mk 32 triple torpedo tubes; 2 × Mk 9 Depth Charge Racks; 6 × M2HB Browning .50 caliber machine guns

ROKS Pohang (PCC-756) was a Pohang-class corvette of the Republic of Korea Navy. She was decommissioned and now serves as a museum ship in Pohang, South Korea.

== Development and design ==
The Pohang class is a series of corvettes built by different Korean shipbuilding companies. The class consists of 24 ships and some after decommissioning were sold or given to other countries. There are five different types of designs in the class from Flight II to Flight VI.

== Construction and career ==
Pohang was launched on 7 February 1984 by Hanjin Heavy Industries in Busan. The vessel was commissioned on 18 December 1984 and decommissioned on 30 June 2009. She now serves as a museum ship in Pohang and in 2010, the ROKS Cheonan memorial aboard her was opened.
