= Agency for Defense Development =

South Korean military R&D agency

- 국방과학연구소

Agency overview
- Formed: 6 August 1970; 56 years ago
- Preceding agency: Ministry of National Defense Scientific Research Institute (July 1954–July 1961)
- Jurisdiction: Government of South Korea
- Headquarters: 160, Bugyuseong-daero 488beon-gil, Yuseong District, Daejeon, South Korea; 36.4184077°N 127.3225271°E
- Motto: "Defending our nation with the strength of our own science and technology!"
- Employees: 3,432 (2023)
- Annual budget: ₩1.485 trillion US$1.188 billion (2022)
- Agency executives: Park Jong-seung, Director; Jung Jin-gyeong, Deputy Director
- Parent department: Defense Acquisition Program Administration
- Website: Official ADD website in English; Official ADD website in Korean

Korean name
- Hangul: 국방과학연구소
- Hanja: 國防科學硏究所
- RR: Gukbang gwahak yeonguso
- MR: Kukpang kwahak yŏn'guso

The Agency for Defense Development (ADD; Korean: 국방과학연구소) is the South Korean government agency for research and development in defense technology, funded by the Defense Acquisition Program Administration (DAPA). It was established in August 1970 under the banner of the self-reliant national defense promoted by President Park Chung Hee.

Its purpose is contributing to enforcing the national defence, to improving the national R&D capacity, and to fostering the domestic defense industry. ADD focuses on core weapons systems and core technology development, and studies major weapons platforms in high-risk and non-economical fields, unmanned and advanced, and new weapon systems for the future.

ADD is responsible for first South Korean ballistic missile Nike Hercules Korea-1 aka White/Polar Bear, developed in the 1970s with its first successful test in 1978.

ADD is the operator of South Korea's first dedicated military satellite, ANASIS-II, launched on 20 July 2020 by a Falcon 9 rocket.

== History ==
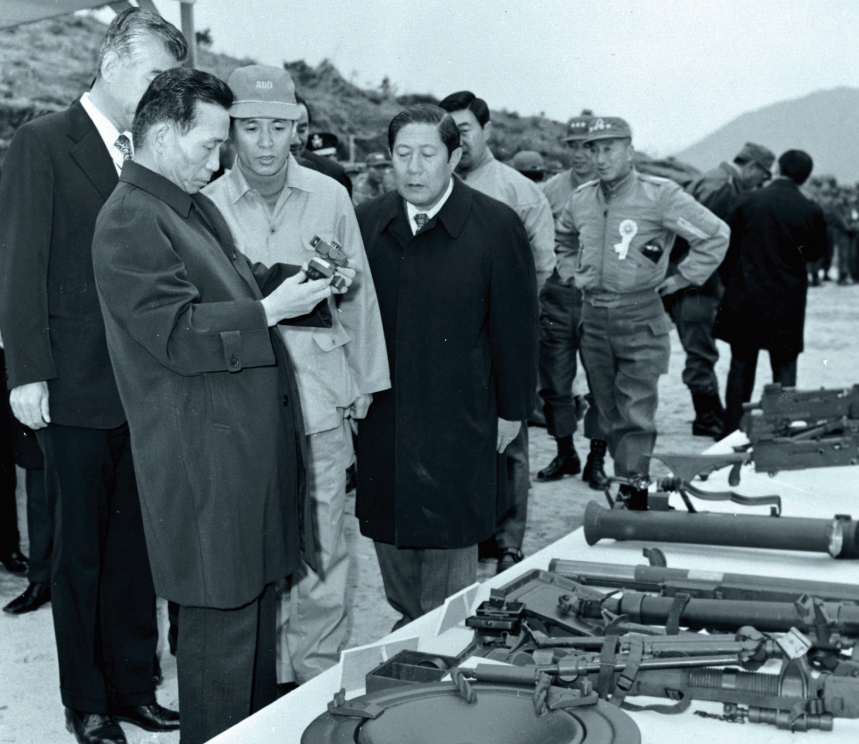
President Park Chung Hee inspects prototypes developed in ADD at the Military Equipment Exhibition on 3 April 1972

After the three-year Korean War, which ended in an armistice rather than an end-of-war agreement, South Korea and North Korea were in conflict during the Cold War. Since the Mutual Defense Treaty signed in October 1953, South Korea has been making efforts to rebuild its economy while receiving military aid from the United States. Despite military aid from the U.S. and abroad, in July 1954, Rhee Syng-man, then the first president of the South Korean government, established the Ministry of National Defense Scientific Research Institute to foster independent defense production capabilities, and the South Korean government's attempt to produce its own military supplies has contributed to the localization of military supplies such as military food, combat uniforms, and defense components that relied solely on foreign aid.

After the Nixon Doctrine announced on July 25, 1969, about 20,000 U.S. troops in South Korea withdrew, creating an atmosphere of reconciliation between the United States and the Eastern Bloc. President Park Chung Hee, who has been in power since December 1963, believed that the withdrawal of Nixon Doctrine and U.S. troops from South Korea would weaken the military power of South Korea, which relied on the U.S., and North Korea's military provocations against the South, which began in the late 1960s, surged further, and the South Korean government began to feel the need for self-reliant national defense, which did not rely on U.S. military aid. Later, in August 1970, the Agency for Defense Development was established, and in November of the following year, it started an independent defense development project called the Basic Weapon Emergency Prototype Development.

However, in the 1970s, South Korea had poor basic industries and systems to develop and stably produce military equipment. In 1973, the South Korean government designated heavy and chemical industries such as steel, machinery, chemicals, and Petroleum as national strategic industries to foster basic industries. Later, in February 1974, the eight-year military construction defense plan (군사력 건설 국방 8개년 계획), called Yulgok Project, began, which included plans to strengthen the South Korean military's power.

== Organization ==
=== Audit department ===
- Director
- Defense industry technology support center

==== Deputy director ====
Sources:

- Policy Planning Department
- Research Planning Department
- Academy of Defense Science and Technology
- Ground Technology Research Institute
- Maritime Technology Research Institute
- Aerospace Technology Research Institute
- Institute of Civil-Military Technology Cooperation
- 1st Research and Development Institute
- 2nd Research and Development Institute
- 3rd Research and Development Institute
- 4th Research and Development Institute
- 5th Research and Development Institute
- Institute of Defense Advanced Technology Research
- Defense Rapid Acquisition Technology Research Institute
- Research Support Headquarters
- Safety and Security Center

== Major research and development projects ==
Development programs for defense technology are categorized into basic research and development, key technology R&D, civil-military technology cooperation, and essential parts, software development and technology demonstration of new concepts. Almost all major development projects are collaborating with ADD and South Korean defense company, most of the key technologies are developed under the initiative of the ADD, and private defense companies are responsible for the development of the remaining sub-technology and the production of essential parts and finished products.

=== Infantry weapon ===
- K1 selective-fire assault rifle
- K2 assault rifle
- K3 light machine gun
- K4 automatic grenade launcher
- K7 silenced submachine gun

=== Missile systems ===
- Hycore hypersonic cruise missile system
- Poniard (Bigung) 2.75-inch in diameter guided rocket system
- K136 Kooryong 36 extended multiple rocket launcher system
  - Biryong (Flying Dragon) short range ship-to-ship guided weapon system based on K136
- K239 Chunmoo self-propelled multiple rocket launcher system
- AT-1K Raybolt (Hyeongung) medium range infantry missile system
- LAH-AGM (Taipers) air-to-ground guided missile system
- K745A1 Red Shark (Hongsangeo) anti-submarine missile system
- SSM-700K C-Star (Haeseong-I) subsonic anti-ship cruise missile system
  - SSM-710K (Haeseong-II) enhanced cruise missile system
    - SSM-750K (Haeseong-III) enhanced cruise missile system
- Korean supersonic anti-ship cruise missile system
- Haeryong (Sea Dragon) tactical ship-launched land attack missile based on the Haeseong I
- Ure (KTSSM) tactical surface-to-surface missile system
- Hyunmoo ballistic missile system

=== Missile defense systems ===
- KP-SAM (Chiron) manportable surface-to-air missile system
- K-SAM (Pegasus) short-range surface-to-air missile system based on Crotale R440 missile system
- M-SAM medium-range surface-to-air missile system based on technology from the 9M96 missile used on S-350E and S-400 missile systems
  - M-SAM Block-II enhanced medium-range surface-to-air missile system
- K-SAAM (Haegung) short range ship-based surface-to-air missile system
- L-SAM long-range multi-layered missile defense system

=== Ground weapon systems ===
- KH178 105 mm towed howitzer
- KH179 155 mm towed howitzer
- K9 Thunder 155 mm self-propelled howitzer
- K2 Black Panther main battle tank
- K21 infantry fighting vehicle
- K200 infantry fighting vehicle
- K30 Biho self-propelled anti-aircraft guns
- Korean Amphibious Assault Vehicle-II (KAAV-II)
- Unmanned Surveillance Vehicle
- K-NBC reconnaissance vehicle
- High energy laser
- KAPS hard-kill active protection system

=== Maritime and underwater weapon systems ===
- Korean Vertical Launching System (K-VLS)
- Harbor Underwater Surveillance System (HUSS)
- Towed Array Sonar System (TASS)
- Torpedo Acoustic Counter Measure (TACM)
- Incheon-class frigate (FFG) sonar system
- KDX-III batch-II (DDG) integrated sonar system
- Jangbogo-III class (KSS-III) batch-I combat system
- Jangbogo-III class (KSS-III) batch-I sonar system
- Landing Platform Helicopter (LPH) combat system
- Yoon Youngha-class patrol vessel (PKG) combat system
- Ulsan-class frigate (FF) batch-I combat system
- Ulsan-class frigate (FF) batch-III combat system
- Dolgorae-class (Dolphin) midget submarine
- Multi-Mission Unmanned Surface Vehicle (MMUSV)
- Nobong 40 mm twin naval cannon developed in 1996 to replace the OTO Melara DARDO CIWS of the Republic of Korea Navy
- K731 White Shark (Baek sang eo) heavy anti-submarine torpedo
- K745 Blue Shark (Cheong sang eo) light anti-submarine torpedo
- K761 Tiger Shark (Beom sang eo) heavy anti-submarine torpedo

=== Aircraft and UAV systems ===
- KF-21 (Boramae) 4.5 generation fighter aircraft exploratory development
- KUH-1 (Surion) medium transport helicopter mission equipment package
- KT-1 (Woongbi) basic trainer
  - KA-1 tactical control aircraft
- KGGB (Korean Guided GPS Bomb) precision guided glide bomb
- RQ-101 (Songgolmae) corps level reconnaissance UAV
- NCUAV next-generation reconnaissance UAV that is being jointly developed with Korea Aerospace Industries
- KUS-FS multipurpose medium-altitude long-endurance unmanned aerial vehicle
- LAH (Light Armed Helicopter) exploratory development
- Graphite bomb

=== Surveillance and reconnaissance systems ===
- Radar for land systems
- KF-21 Active Electronically Scanned Array (AESA) radar
- Ulsan-class frigate batch-I AESA Radar
- Synthetic Aperture Radar (SAR) for KUS-FS
- Korean Commander's Panoramic Sight (KCPS) for K1A1
- Korean Gunner's Primary Sight (KGPS) for K2 Black Panther
- Sight system for K21 infantry fighting vehicle
- Thermal Observation Device (TOD)
- Electro-Optical Tracking System (EOTS) for PKG combat system
- Infrared Search and Track (IRST) for shipborne systems
- Forward-looking infrared (FLIR) system for KUH-1
- Tactical Electro-Optical and Infrared reconnaissance system (Tac-EO/IR)
- Electro-Optical and Infrared system for KUS-FS
- Electro-Optical and Infrared system for NCUAV
- Infrared camera for satellites
- Multi-sensor and multi-source imagery fusion system

=== Command and control and information warfare systems ===
- Tactical Information Communications Network (TICN)
- Joint Tactical Data Link System (JTDLS)
- Air Defense Command Control and Alert (ADC2A) system
- Airborne ELINT pod system
- Tactical communication electronic warfare (EW) system-II (TLQ-200K)
- Airborne electronic countermeasure (ECM) pod system (ALQ-200)
- Shipboard electronic warfare system (SLQ-200K)
- Advanced SIGINT aircraft system

=== Space technologies ===
- Reconnaissance space-based surveillance and reconnaissance system
- Small satellite system
- Military satellite communication system-I
  - Military satellite communication system-II

=== Core technologies ===
- Seeker
- Laser Detection and Ranging (LADAR)
- Optical Phased Array-Based LADAR
- Navigation technology
- Micromachined inertial sensors
- Fibre-Optic Gyroscope (FOG)
- Hemispherical Resonator Gyroscope (HRG)
- Control Moment Gyroscope (CMG)
- Star tracker
- Terrain Referenced Navigation
- Ground-Based Radio System (GRNS)
- Anti-jamming technology
- Global Navigation Satellite System (GNSS) Jamming
- Rocket propulsion
- Ramjet propulsion
- Engine Technology (subsonic gas Turbine and high speed) for missiles and UAV
- Defense materials
- Fuel cells and special batteries
- Underwater acoustic sensor
- Hyperspectral image equipment
- EMP (Electromagnetic Pulse) technology
- Directional Infrared Countermeasure (DIRCM)
- High Energy Material (HEM)
- Ballistic protection technology
- Precision-guided munition
- Railgun
- Dual barrel air-burst technology for XK13 25 mm OCSW, Cancelled in 2013.
- Warrior platform
- AI-based autonomy technology
- Autonomous tunnel exploration robot
- Rescue robot
- Tailless demonstrator UAV for KUS-FC Unmanned combat aerial vehicle
- Unmanned Combat Compound Rotorcraft (UCCR)
- Anti-Submarine Warfare Unmanned Underwater Vehicle (ASWUUV)
- Supercavitating torpedo
- Cyber security technologies
- Verification of chemical warfare agents
- Detoxification technology

=== Future technologies ===
- Artificial intelligence (AI)
- Blockchain
- Internet of Military Things (IoMT)
- Quantum technology
- Photonic radar technology
- Atomic technology
- Terahertz technology
- Perovskite solar cell (PSC)
- Self-generated electrostatic energy
- Synthetic biology
- Meta-material for stealth technology
- Biomimetic robot
- Swarming unmanned system technology
- Boost phase interceptor
- Counter long-range artillery interceptor system
- Intelligent self-learning-based autonomous jamming
- Centralized sequential kill-chain

== See also ==
- Defense industry of South Korea
- Solid-Fuel Space Launch Vehicle
