= ROKS Cheonan =

ROKS Cheonan is the name of two South Korean Navy warships:

- ROKS Cheonan (PCC-772), a Pohang-class corvette from 1989 to 2010.
- ROKS Cheonan (FFG-826), a Daegu-class frigate commissioned in 2023.
