= Anheung Proving Ground =

Coordinates: 36°42′N 126°29′E

Anheung Proving Ground (Korean: 안흥종합시험장) is a launch site for sounding rockets in Taean County, South Korea.

== History ==
The site was first started as a testing ground for the Agency for Defense Development under the South Korean Ministry of Defense in 1977.
