= K731 White Shark =

South Korean submarine-launched torpedo

K731 White Shark K731 백상어 중어뢰
- Type: Heavyweight dual-purpose ASW and ASuW torpedo
- Place of origin: South Korea

Service history
- Used by: Republic of Korea Navy

Production history
- Designer: Agency for Defense Development; LG Innotek
- Designed: 1995
- Manufacturer: LIG Nex1
- Produced: 2004–present

Specifications
- Mass: 1,100 kg
- Length: 6 m
- Width: 0.483 m
- Warhead weight: 370kg
- Operational range: 30 km
- Maximum speed: 35+ knots (63+ km/h)
- Launch platform: Submarine

K731 White Shark (Korean: 백상어; RR: Baek-sang-eo) heavy torpedo is a submarine-launched torpedo developed by the Republic of Korea Navy in 2004. Production was delayed by a year after a program error in the guidance system resulted in 2 failed tests in 2003. The glitch was fixed while developing the lighter-weight Blue Shark torpedo. Production cost for each torpedo is about 950 million won (US$790,000).

== See also ==
- K745 Blue Shark
- K745A1 Red Shark
- K761 Tiger Shark
- Republic of Korea Navy
- List of torpedoes
- List of torpedoes by country
