= Daegu-class frigate =

Ship class

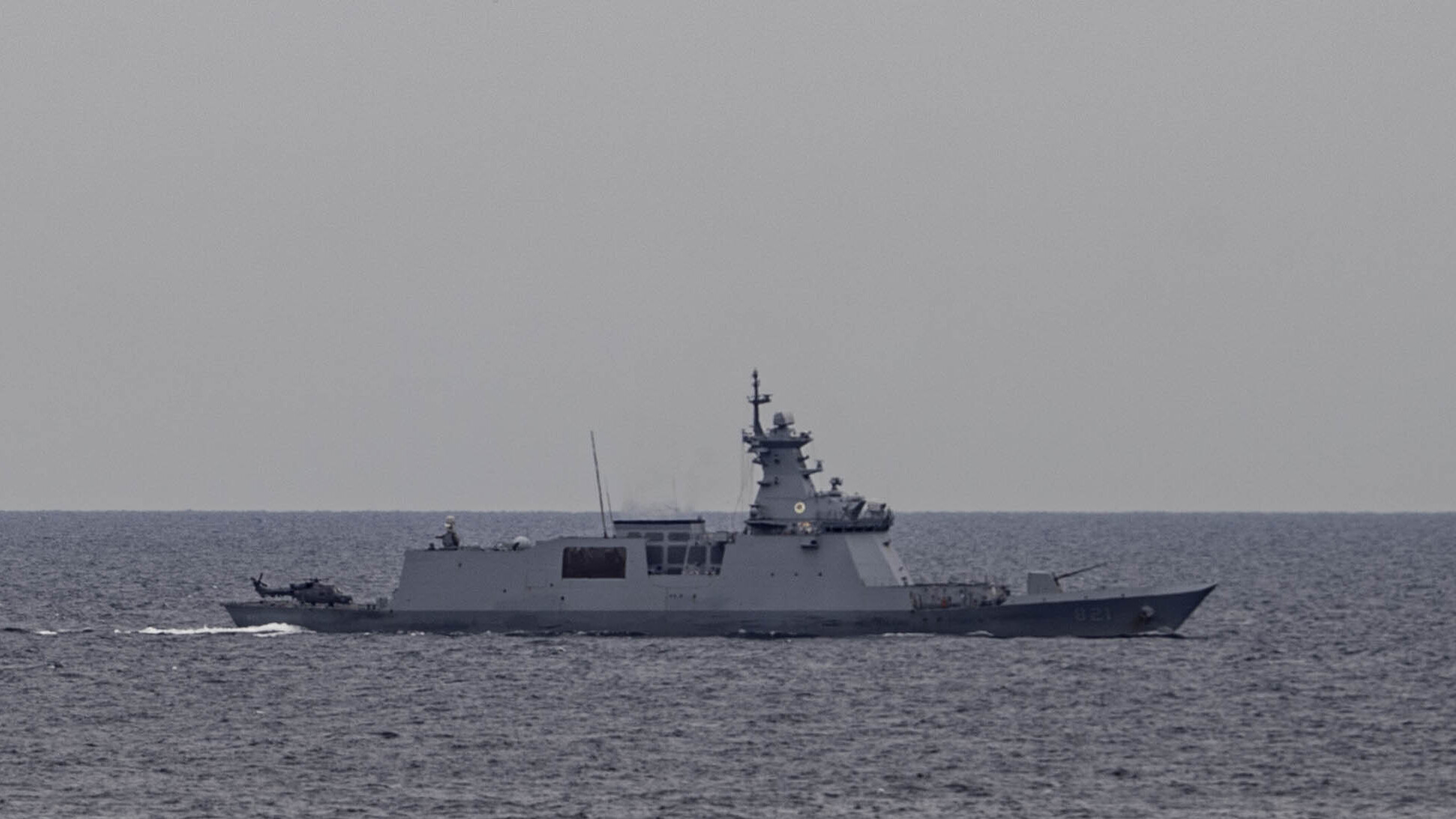
- ROKS Seoul

Class overview
- Name: Daegu class
- Builders: Daewoo Shipbuilding & Marine Engineering; Hyundai Heavy Industries
- Operators: Republic of Korea Navy
- Preceded by: Incheon class
- Succeeded by: Chungnam class
- In commission: 2018–present
- Planned: 8
- Completed: 8
- Active: 8

General characteristics
- Type: Guided missile frigate
- Displacement: 3,100 t (empty), 3,600 t (full load)
- Length: 122 m (400 ft 3 in)
- Beam: 14 m (45 ft 11 in)
- Draft: 4 m (13 ft 1 in)
- Propulsion: Combined diesel–electric or gas; 1 × Rolls-Royce MT30 gas turbine; 4 × MTU 12V 4000 M53B diesel engine; 2 × Leonardo DRS electric motors
- Speed: 30 knots (56 km/h; 35 mph) (max); 18 knots (33 km/h; 21 mph) (cruising)
- Range: 4,500 nmi (8,300 km; 5,200 mi)
- Complement: 140
- Sensors & processing systems: SPS-550K air search 3D radar; SPG-540K fire control radar; SQS-240K hull-mounted sonar; SQR-250K towed array sonar system; SAQ-540K EOTS; Hanwha Systems SAQ-600K IRSTs; Naval Shield Integrated Combat Management System
- Electronic warfare & decoys: LIG Nex1 SLQ-200(V)K Sonata electronic warfare suite; SLQ-261K torpedo acoustic counter measures; MASS decoy launchers
- Armament: 1 × 5-inch (127 mm)/L62 caliber Mk 45 Mod 4 naval gun; 1 × 20 mm Phalanx CIWS; 6 × K745 Blue Shark torpedo in triple torpedo tubes; 16-cell K-VLS for: Haegung K-SAAM quadpacked in 4 per cell; Haeryong VL-Tactical Land Attack Missiles; K745A1 Red Shark
- Aircraft carried: Super Lynx or AW159 helicopter
- Aviation facilities: Flight deck and enclosed hangar for one medium-lift helicopter

The Daegu-class frigate (Hangul: 대구급 호위함, Hanja: 大邱級護衛艦) is a class of guided missile frigates of the Republic of Korea Navy (ROKN). The Daegu class is based on the preceding Incheon class, and has otherwise been referred to as the Incheon class batch II, FFG-II, or FFX-II. Eight Daegu-class ships have been commissioned, with the final goal of 20–22 frigates, of all types, in the ROKN. The Daegu-class frigates were built by Daewoo Shipbuilding & Marine Engineering (DSME) and Hyundai Heavy Industries.

== Features ==
The Daegu class (FFX-II, FFG-II) is an improved variant of the Incheon-class frigate (FFX-I, FFG-I). Modifications to the Incheon class include a TB-250K towed array sonar system and a 16-cell Korean Vertical Launching System (K-VLS), that is able to deploy the K-SAAM, K745A1 Red Shark anti-submarine missile, and SSM-700K Haeseong tactical land attack cruise missiles.

The hull design is generally based on the Incheon class. As a part of weapon system modifications, the superstructure has been significantly changed. The hangar and a helicopter deck on the stern has been enlarged to support the operation of a 10-ton helicopter.

The Daegu class is the first South Korean warship equipped with a combined diesel-electric or gas (CODLOG) propulsion system. The propulsion system of the ROKN ships have a gas turbine direct drive, and four high speed diesel generators driving two Leonardo DRS permanent magnet electric motors. The Rolls Royce MT30 turbine engine replaces the twin gas turbine layout of the Incheon-class frigates.

The Daegu class provides improved anti-submarine warfare (ASW) capability than the predecessor Incheon class. An improved ASW capability is provided by the Hanwha Systems SQS-250K towed array sonar and SQS-240K hull-mounted sonar.

== Ships in the class ==
Name	Pennant number	Builder	Launched	Commissioned	Status
ROKS Daegu	FFG-818	DSME	2 June 2016	6 March 2018	Active
ROKS Gyeongnam	FFG-819	DSME	21 June 2019	4 Jan 2021	Active
ROKS Seoul	FFG-821	Hyundai Heavy Industries	11 November 2019	July 2021	Active
ROKS Donghae	FFG-822	Hyundai Heavy Industries	29 April 2020	10 November 2021	Active
ROKS Daejeon	FFG-823	DSME	3 May 2021	27 February 2023	Active
ROKS Pohang	FFG-825	DSME	8 September 2021	28 February 2023	Active
ROKS Cheonan	FFG-826	Hyundai Heavy Industries	9 November 2021	19 May 2023	Active
ROKS Chuncheon	FFG-827	Hyundai Heavy Industries	22 March 2022	24 October 2023	Active

== Export ==
=== Peru ===
On 16 April 2024, Hyundai Heavy Industries signed a ₩640.6 billion ($463.7 million) deal with SIMA, Peru's state-run shipyard, to build four naval vessels, including a 3,400-ton frigate based on the Daegu class. The ship will be built at a local Peruvian shipyard under the deal and delivered to the Peruvian Navy in 2030.

== See also ==
Equivalent modern guided-missile frigates

- Martadinata-class – (Indonesia)
