= Korean vertical launching system =

Korean vertical launching system 한국형 수직발사체계
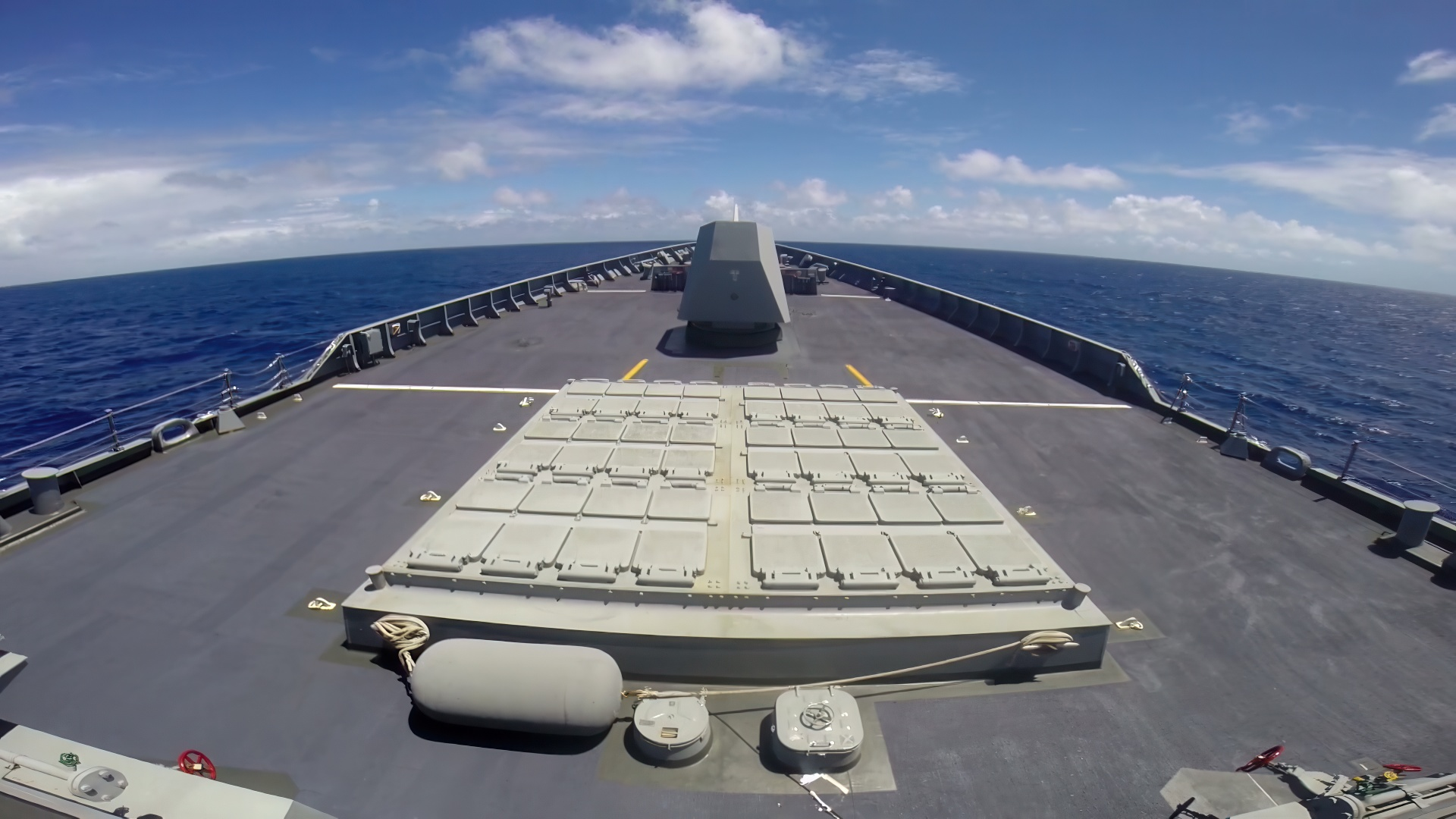
- 8-cell KVLS modules of the Sejong the Great-class destroyer of the Republic of Korea Navy.
- Type: Vertical launching system
- Place of origin: South Korea

Service history
- In service: 2003–present
- Used by: Republic of Korea Navy

Production history
- Designer: Agency for Defense Development
- Designed: 2000s
- Manufacturer: Hanwha Aerospace
- Produced: 2002–present
- Variants: KVLS-II

The Korean vertical launching system (KVLS; Korean: 한국형 수직발사체계; Hanja: 韓國型垂直發射體系), or K-VLS is a hot-launch vertical launching system developed by South Korea to be deployed by the Republic of Korea Navy. It is used in the Sejong the Great-class destroyer, KSS-III submarine, and is scheduled to be added to the Daegu-class frigate. The K-VLS can deploy the Cheongung air defense missile (KM-SAM), Haegung air defense missile (K-SAAM), K745A1 Red Shark anti-submarine missile, Haeseong-II, Hyunmoo-3 land-attack cruise missiles and even SLBMs.

Three systems may be referred to as K-VLS.

- The "K-VLS" is comparable in size and role to the strike-length Mk 41 VLS. It comes in 8-cell modules sized at 3.165 m × 2.076 m × 7.7 m.
- The "K-VLS Compact" is specialized for the K-SAAM surface-to-air missile. It comes in modules of 4 cells, sized at 2.9 m × 2.6 m × 4.9 m (length-width-height). Its role can be compared to the Mk 48/56 VLS for RIM-162 ESSM.
- Dosan Ahn Changho-class submarines use a K-VLS that has a module size different from either version. Presumably this is a distinct variant comparable in role to the US Mk 45.

A newer version called KVLS-II was unveiled in 2021. It comes in modules of 4 cells, sized at 3.0 m × 2.4 m × 9.8 m (L-W-H). An upsized system with increased exhaust handling capacity, its role is comparable to the US Mk 57 VLS.

== Ships using KVLS ==
Class	Ship type	K-VLS complement
Chungmugong Yi Sun-shin-class (KDX-II)	Destroyer	24 K-VLS
Sejong the Great-class (KDX-III)	Destroyer	48 K-VLS (Batch I) / 16 K-VLS + 24 K-VLS II (Batch II)
Daegu-class (FFX-II)	Frigate	16 K-VLS
Chungnam-class (FFX-III)	Frigate	16 K-VLS
Nampo-class	Minelayer	4 K-VLS Compact
Cheon Wang Bong-class	LST	4 K-VLS Compact
Dosan Ahn Changho-class (KSS-III)	Attack submarine	6 K-VLS Submarine (Batch I) / 10 K-VLS Submarine (Batch II)
Dokdo-class	LPH	4 K-VLS Compact

== See also ==
- GJB 5860-2006 - A vertical launching system of People's Liberation Army Navy
- Mark 41 Vertical Launching System - A vertical launching system of United States Navy.
- 3S-14 - A vertical launching system of Russian Navy for cruise, anti-ship and anti-submarine missiles.
- Sylver - A vertical launching system designed by DCNS.
