= Rolls-Royce MT30 =

Marine gas turbine alternator

MT30
- Type: Gas turbine
- National origin: United Kingdom
- Manufacturer: Rolls-Royce plc
- First run: 6 September 2002
- Developed from: Rolls-Royce Trent 800

The Rolls-Royce MT30 (Marine Turbine) is a marine gas turbine engine based on the Rolls-Royce Trent 800 aero engine. The MT30 retains 80% commonality with the Trent 800, the engine for the Boeing 777. The maximum power rating is 40 MW and minimum efficient power 25 MW.

Rolls-Royce announced the MT30 program on 11 September 2001. The first run of the engine was on 6 September 2002. In early 2003 the MT30 was selected to power the Royal Navy future aircraft carriers (CVFs) and the demonstrator of the US Navy's DD(X) multi-mission destroyer. In June 2004 Lockheed Martin awarded the engine contract to the MT30 for its littoral combat ship design.

In 2012 the company repackaged the MT30 so that it would fit into smaller ships, and the first such order came from South Korea, for its Daegu-class frigates.

In May 2021, Rolls-Royce and Hindustan Aeronautics Limited (HAL) signed a Memorandum of Understanding (MoU) to service the MT30 turbines in India, for the Indian Navy's Next Generation needs.

== Testing and certification ==
In 2002, the first MT30 development engine, the D1, was produced and testing began in August of that same year. The initial purpose of the program was to complete proof of concept, and initial functional testing of the engine. The first D1 engine test was successful, and demonstrated the robustness of the engine design. In March 2003, after achieving 258 hours of running, including 126 hours of endurance testing, the D1 engine was removed, following the development of the D2 engine. In June, 2003, the second development engine, the D2, began functional testing. The D2 engine was built close to production standard, and included a large level of instrumentation. The development of the D2 aimed to clear the majority of operational and functional requirements required for the final MT30 engine. Testing of the D2 engine concluded in August 2003, after 110 hours of functional testing. Rolls-Royce, following the successful testing of the D1, and D2 engines, commenced a program of testing aimed at clearing the MT30 engine for an ABS approval. This required for the MT30 engine to successfully complete 198, 8 hour operation cycles for a total of 1500 hours of running time. The ABS test was successfully completed in July, 2004. Only one significant issue arose during the test, a bearing was damaged due to debris being trapped by magnetic chip detectors in the oil system, which was later fixed. Following the successful ABS test, the MT30 was certified for production.

== Engineering information ==
The Rolls-Royce MT30 is based on the Rolls-Royce Trent 3-shaft architecture, which utilizes three independent shafts, each one rotating at different speeds, connecting different turbine stages to different compressor stages. The MT30 Gas Turbine, shares significant commonality with the Aero Trent engines, used in the aviation industry.

=== Power output ===
The MT30 Gas Turbine, is flat-rated to provide 36MWb of output power, via inlet temperatures ranging from -40 °C to +38 °C. If required, alternative engine ratings can provide up to 40MW of power at a 15 °C inlet temperature. The MT30 is capable of delivering high power outputs at high-ambient air temperatures, a unique feature of the engine.

=== Compact package ===
In marine applications, gas turbine engines are usually installed in a package. A gas turbine package includes a base-plate, acoustic enclosure and ancillary systems such as fuel forwarding and lubrication oil. Gas turbine packages are more efficient when compact, therefore, Rolls-Royce developed a 'Compact Package' for the MT30. The Compact Package has a footprint of 8.6 m x 2.7 m, with a weight of 30 tons. The MT30 Compact Package is designed to operate under the following environmental conditions:

- External Air Temperature, -35 °C to +50 °C
- Seawater Temperature, -2 °C to +40 °C

As a maintenance feature, large removable panels have been fitted rather than conventional opening doors, due to the minimum space available around the gas turbine. Furthermore, lightweight temporary deck-mounted platforms, which are fitted in pre-defined slots, allow safe and easy access to the gas turbine and the appropriate ancillary systems.

== Applications ==
- Queen Elizabeth-class aircraft carrier (UK)
- Type 26 frigate (UK)
- Hunter-class frigate (Australia)
- Australian GP frigate (Australia)
- Canadian Surface Combatant (Canada)
- Zumwalt-class destroyer (US)
- Freedom-class littoral combat ship (US)
- Daegu-class frigate (South Korea)
- Chungnam-class frigate (South Korea)
- Italian landing helicopter dock Trieste (Italy)
- Mogami-class frigate (Japan)

== See also ==
Related development

- Rolls-Royce Trent 800

Comparable engines

- General Electric LM2500
- General Electric LM9000
- Rolls-Royce Marine Spey
