= Combined diesel–electric and gas =

Modification of the combined diesel and gas propulsion system for ships

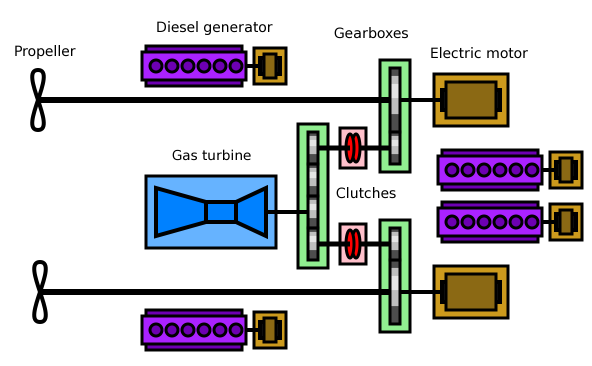
Principle of a CODLAG propulsion system

Combined diesel–electric and gas (CODLAG) is a modification of the combined diesel and gas propulsion system for ships. A variant, called the combined diesel–electric or gas (CODLOG) system, contains the same basic elements but will not allow simultaneous use of the alternative drive sources.

== System ==
Combined marine propulsion
Combined diesel or gas	(CODOG)
Combined diesel and gas	(CODAG)
Combined diesel–electric and diesel	(CODLAD)
Combined diesel–electric and gas	(CODLAG)
Combined diesel and diesel	(CODAD)
Combined steam and gas	(COSAG)
Combined gas or gas	(COGOG)
Combined gas and gas	(COGAG)
Combined gas and steam	(COGAS)
Combined nuclear and steam	(CONAS)
Integrated electric propulsion	(IEP or IFEP)

A CODLAG system employs electric motors which are connected to the propeller shafts (usually two). The motors are powered by diesel generators. For higher speeds, a gas turbine powers the shafts via a cross-connecting gearbox; for cruise speed, the drive train of the turbine is disengaged with clutches.

This arrangement combines the diesel engines used for propulsion and for electric power generation, greatly reducing service cost, since it reduces the number of different diesel engines and electric motors, requiring considerably less maintenance. Also, electric motors work efficiently over a wide speed range, and can be connected directly to the propeller shaft so that simpler gearboxes can be used to combine the mechanical output of turbine and diesel–electric systems.

Another advantage of the diesel–electric transmission is that without the need of a mechanical connection, the diesel generators can be decoupled acoustically from the hull of the ship, making it less noisy. This has been used extensively by military submarines but surface naval vessels like anti-submarine vessels will benefit as well.

== Integrated electric propulsion (IEP) ==
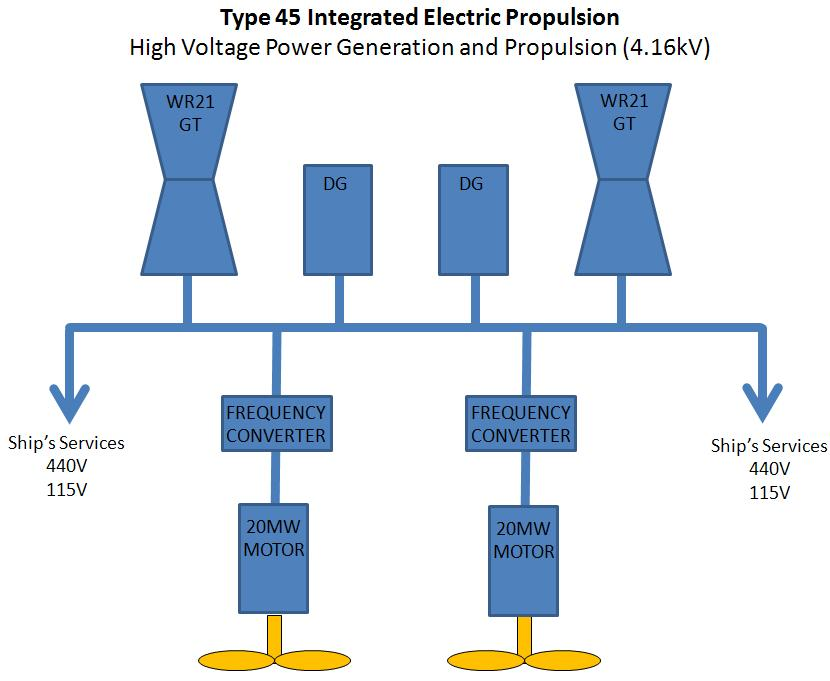
Integrated electric propulsion in the Type 45 destroyer (GT: gas turbine; DG: diesel generator)

A system which uses both diesel engines and gas turbines to generate electricity for electric motors, where there is no mechanical transmission from either to the propellers, is not classified as CODLAG, but as integrated electric propulsion (IEP) or integrated full electric propulsion (IFEP). Such an arrangement is in use on passenger ships like RMS Queen Mary 2, with a pool of diesel generators for the base load and turbo generators for peak power, and on warships such as the Royal Navy's Type 45 destroyer and the Zumwalt-class destroyer (DDG-1000/DD(X)).

== List of CODLAG ships ==
- F110-class frigate (Spanish Navy)
- Type 23 frigate (Royal Navy)
- FREMM multipurpose frigate (Italian Navy version)
- Defence and intervention frigate (French Navy)
- F125 class frigate (German Navy)
- Pohjanmaa-class corvette (Finnish Navy)
- Constellation-class frigate (United States Navy)
- GTS Finnjet (Finnish cruiseferry)

== List of CODLOG ships ==
- Polar-class icebreaker (United States Coast Guard)
- Daegu-class frigate (ROKN)
- Chungnam-class frigate (ROKN)
- FREMM multipurpose frigate (French Navy version)
- Type 26 frigate (Royal Navy, under construction)
- Hunter-class frigate (Royal Australian Navy, under construction)
- River-class destroyer (Royal Canadian Navy, under construction)
- Wasp-class amphibious assault ship (USN)
- America-class amphibious assault ship (USN)

== List of IEP ships ==
- RMS Queen Mary 2
- Wave class tanker (Royal Fleet Auxiliary)
- USNS Lewis and Clark (T-AKE-1) (US Sealift Command)
- Albion class landing platform dock (Royal Navy)
- Type 45 destroyer (Royal Navy)
- Queen Elizabeth-class aircraft carrier (Royal Navy)
- Zumwalt-class destroyer (US Navy)
- Mistral-class amphibious assault ship (French Navy)

== See also ==
- Diesel–electric
