= K745A1 Red Shark =

South Korean anti-submarine missile

K745A1 Red Shark K745A1 홍상어
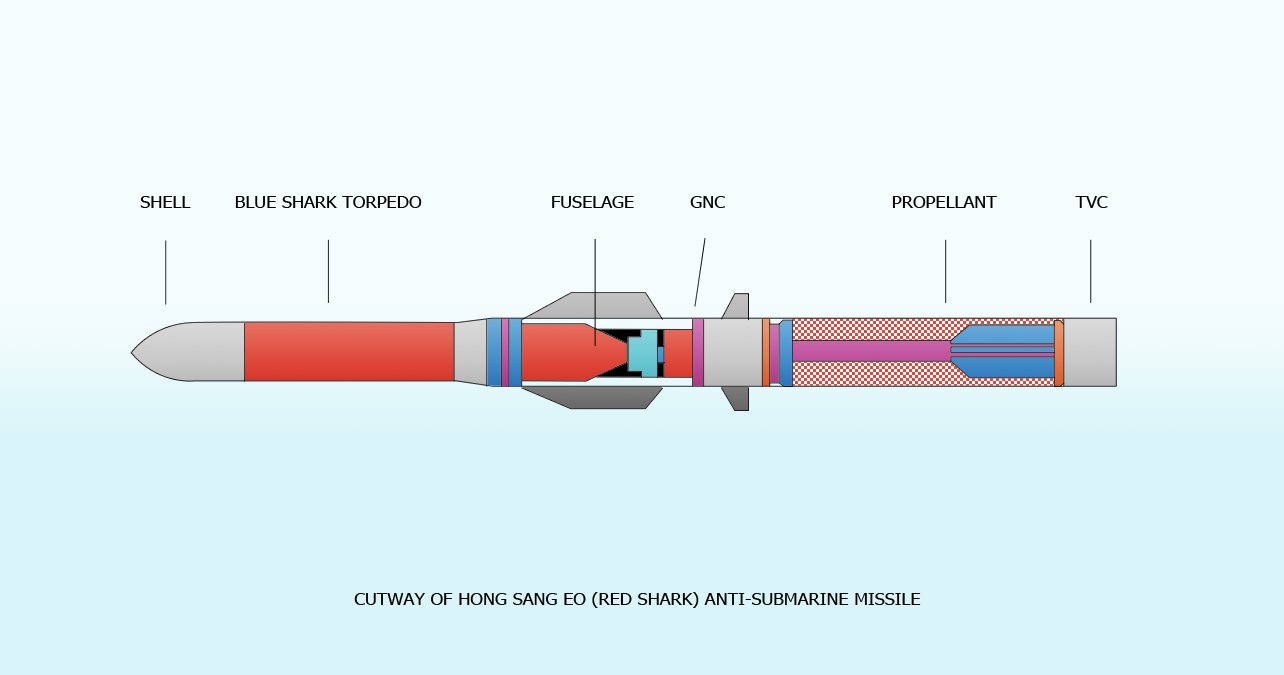
- A K745A1 Red Shark anti-submarine missile launching from the ship's vertical launcher
- Type: Anti-submarine missile Homing torpedo
- Place of origin: South Korea

Service history
- In service: 2010–present
- Used by: Republic of Korea Navy

Production history
- Designer: Agency for Defense Development
- Designed: 1999–2009
- Manufacturer: LIG Defense & Aerospace
- Unit cost: ₩ 2,000,000,000 (US$1.75 million)
- Produced: 2010–present

Specifications
- Mass: 820 kilograms (1,810 lb)
- Length: 5,744 millimeters (18.845 ft)
- Diameter: 382 millimeters (15.0 in)
- Maximum firing range: 19 kilometers (12 mi)
- Warhead: K745 torpedo
- Engine: TVC rocket motor
- Maximum speed: 45 knots (83 km/h; 52 mph)
- Guidance system: Midcourse and terminal guidance
- Launch platform: KVLS

The K745A1 Red Shark (Korean: 홍상어; RR: Hong-sang-eo) torpedo, also called the K-ASROC, is a vertically launched anti-submarine missile developed and tested by Korea University of Science and Technology, the Agency for Defense Development (ADD) and the Republic of Korea Navy in 2009. The Red Shark missile has a range of 12 miles (19 km) and carries a K745 Blue Shark torpedo that is deployed by parachute near the intended target. After release, the Blue Shark independently searches for the target.

The missiles were planned to be deployed on KDX-II and KDX-III destroyers starting in 2010. Each destroyer will carry between 8 (KDX-II) and 16 (KDX-III) of the missiles. The development cost of the program was around US$ 80 million, with a production cost of about $14 million. They were designed in order to combat the potential threat of North Korean submarines.

== Ships ==
The Red Shark missiles are fitted to the following ship classes

- Chungmugong Yi Sun-sin class destroyer (KDX-II)
- King Sejong the Great class destroyer (KDX-III)

== Production ==
Production phase	Production date	Produced
Phase 1	2010-2012	60-70
Phase 2	2013-2015	—N/a

== See also ==
- K731 White Shark
- K745 Blue Shark
- K761 Tiger Shark

=== Weapons of comparable role, performance and era ===
- RPK-6 Vodopad/RPK-7 Veter – (Soviet Union)
- RUM-139 VL-ASROC – (United States)
- SMART – (India)
- Type 07 vertical-launch anti-submarine rocket – (Japan)
