= K-SAAM =

South Korean medium range surface-to-air missile

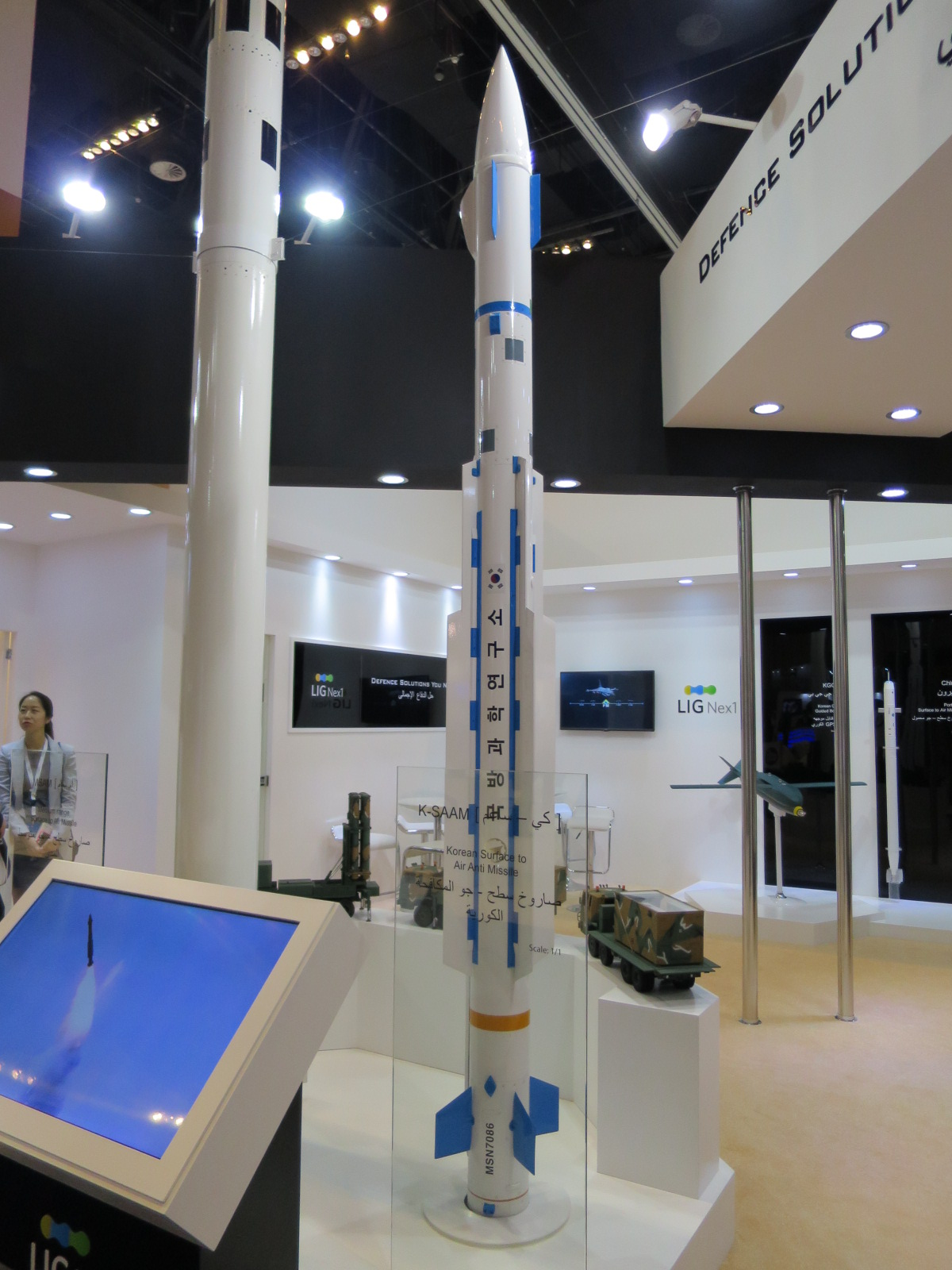
- K-SAAM mockup at IDEX
- Type: Surface-to-air missile
- Place of origin: South Korea

Service history
- In service: 2021-present
- Used by: Republic of Korea Navy

Production history
- Designer: Agency for Defense Development; LIG Nex1 (now LIG Defense & Aerospace); Hanhwa Defense (now Hanwha Aerospace)
- Designed: 2011–2018
- Manufacturer: LIG Defense & Aerospace; Hanwha Aerospace
- Produced: 2019–present

Specifications
- Length: 3.08 meters (10.1 ft)
- Operational range: 20 km (12 mi)
- Maximum speed: Mach 2 (680 m/s; 2,500 km/h)
- Guidance system: Fire-and-forget, infrared homing, ultra-high frequency explorer

The K-SAAM (Korean Surface-to-Anti Air Missile; Korean: 해궁; Hanja: 海弓; RR: Hae-gung) is a South Korean short range ship-launched surface-to-air missile (SAM) system developed by the Agency for Defense Development (ADD), LIG Nex1 and Hanhwa Defense. It features inertial mid-course guidance and a dual microwave and Infrared homing seeker for terminal guidance. It will replace the RIM-116 Rolling Airframe Missile (RAM). It has been deployed on Daegu-class frigates and ROKS Marado.

== History ==
Development started in 2011 which was extended for 2 more years after series of failures during testing in 2016 with testing in 2017 being deemed successful and questioned by anonymous source with knowledge involving evaluation test which referred to North Korean Kumsong-3 anti-ship missile as one of major threats for ROK navy's ships along with other neighbouring countries.

== Export ==
In 2024, it is reported that Malaysia had interest in equipping its Littoral Mission Ship Batch 2 with Korean Surface-to-Anti Air Missile (K-SAAM).

== Operators ==
=== Current operators ===
Republic of Korea

- Republic of Korea Navy

=== Future operators ===
Malaysia

- Royal Malaysian Navy - 48 missiles on order. Will be installed on Littoral Mission Ship Batch 2.

== See also ==
- KP-SAM
- K-SAM (based on Crotale)
- M-SAM
- L-SAM
- List of surface-to-air missiles
- List of anti-aircraft weapons
