= Anti-submarine missile =

Missile designed to target submerged vessels

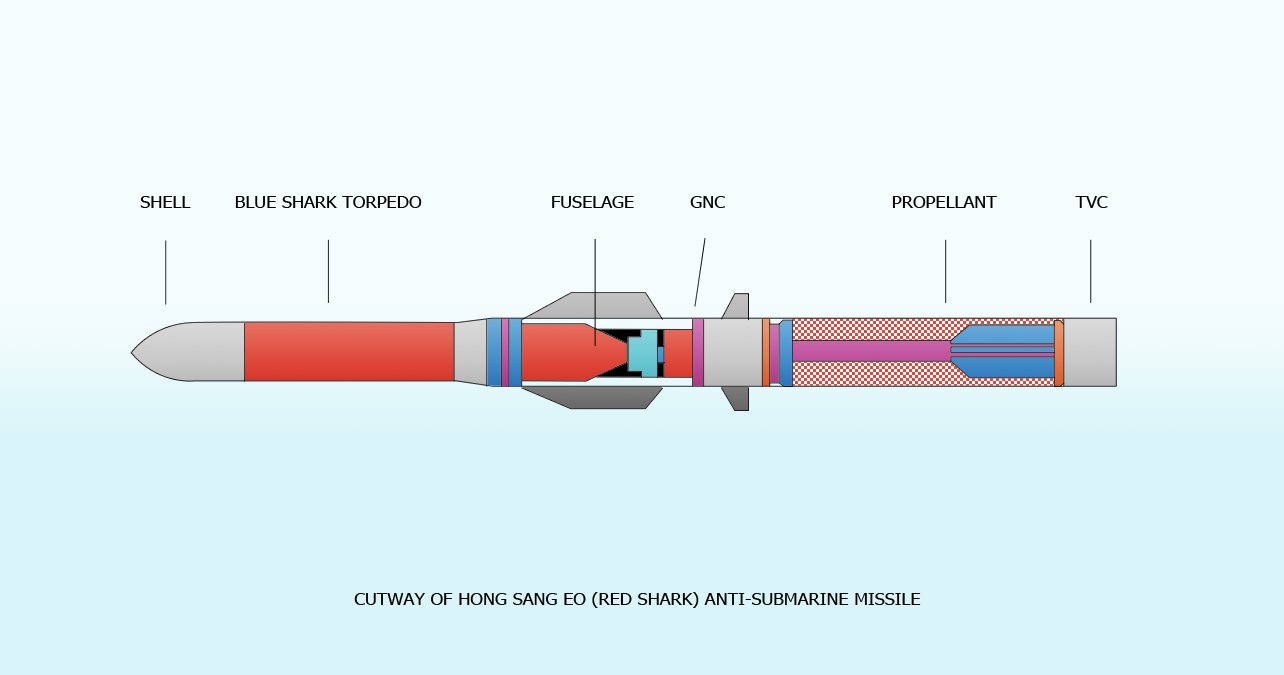
K745A1 Red Shark missile cutaway. The missile uses a K745 Blue Shark anti-submarine torpedo as warhead.

An anti-submarine missile mission profile

An anti-submarine missile is a standoff anti-submarine weapon, often a specialized variant of anti-ship missile. Anti-submarine missiles usually include a jet or rocket engine and a warhead aimed directly at a submarine. In these missiles, a torpedo or a depth charge is used as a warhead. The anti-submarine missile can be either a cruise missile or a ballistic missile.

== History ==
SMART (supersonic missile assisted release of torpedo) launch

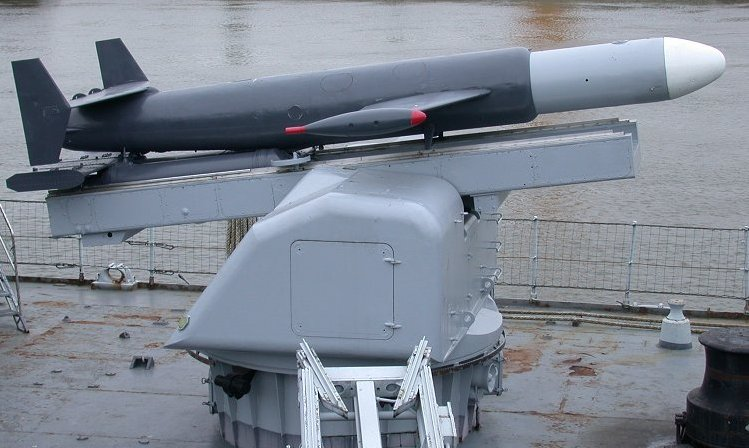
The Malafon, used by the French Navy between 1966 and 1997, used a rocket-assisted glider to carry a torpedo up to 8 nautical miles (13 km) after launch.

Depth charges were the earliest weapons designed for use by ships against submerged submarines. These explosives were initially dropped as the ship moved over the presumed location of a submarine. Before World War II, shipboard sonar was unable to maintain contact with a submarine at close range.

Various mortar-type projectors, including Hedgehog and Squid, were devised during World War II to allow a ship to maintain sonar contact while lobbing explosive charges toward the submarine.

During the Cold War, missiles were developed to provide greater range with reduced recoil. Some missiles and rockets, such as K745A1 Red Shark carry homing torpedoes to provide terminal guidance for the warhead. The advantage of an anti-submarine missile is the attack stand-off range.

== Examples ==
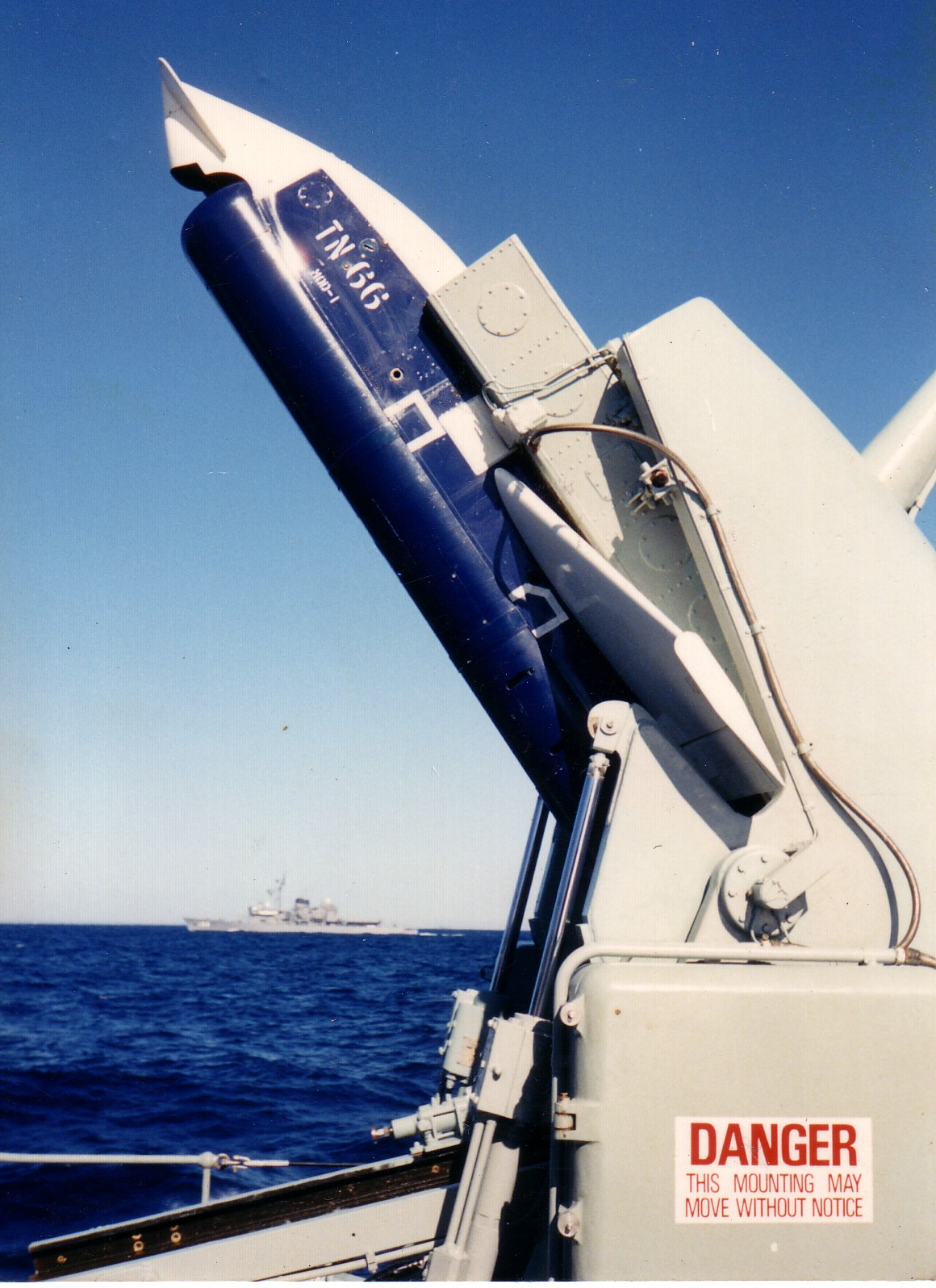
Ikara, an Australian-designed missile used by several navies between the 1960s and 1990s; a rocket-parachute delivery system carried an acoustic torpedo up to 10 nautical miles (19 km) after launch. A variant re-designed in the UK and used by the Royal Navy could deliver a nuclear depth charge.

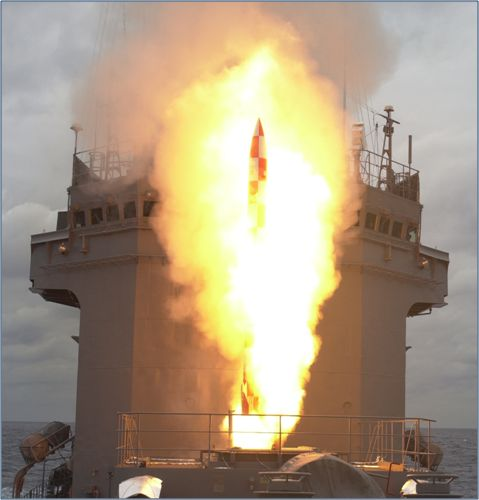
Japanese Type 07 VL-ASROC missile launched from vertical launching system.

- Australia
  - Ikara
- France
  - Malafon
- India
  - SMART
- Italy
  - MILAS
- Japan
  - Type 07 vertical-launch anti-submarine rocket
- People's Republic of China
  - CJ-1 Torpedo
  - CY Series
- South Korea
  - K745A1 Red Shark
- Soviet Union/Russian Federation
  - 85RU
  - RPK-2 Vyuga
  - 86R
  - 88R
  - RPK-1 Vikhr
  - RPK-9 Medvedka
  - Metel Anti-Ship Complex
  - 91R Otvet Anti-Submarine Complex
- United Kingdom/Australia
  - Ikara
- United States
  - RUM-139 VL-ASROC
  - RUR-5 ASROC
  - UUM-44 SUBROC
