= K745 Blue Shark =

South Korean light anti-submarine torpedo

K745 Blue Shark K745 청상어 경어뢰
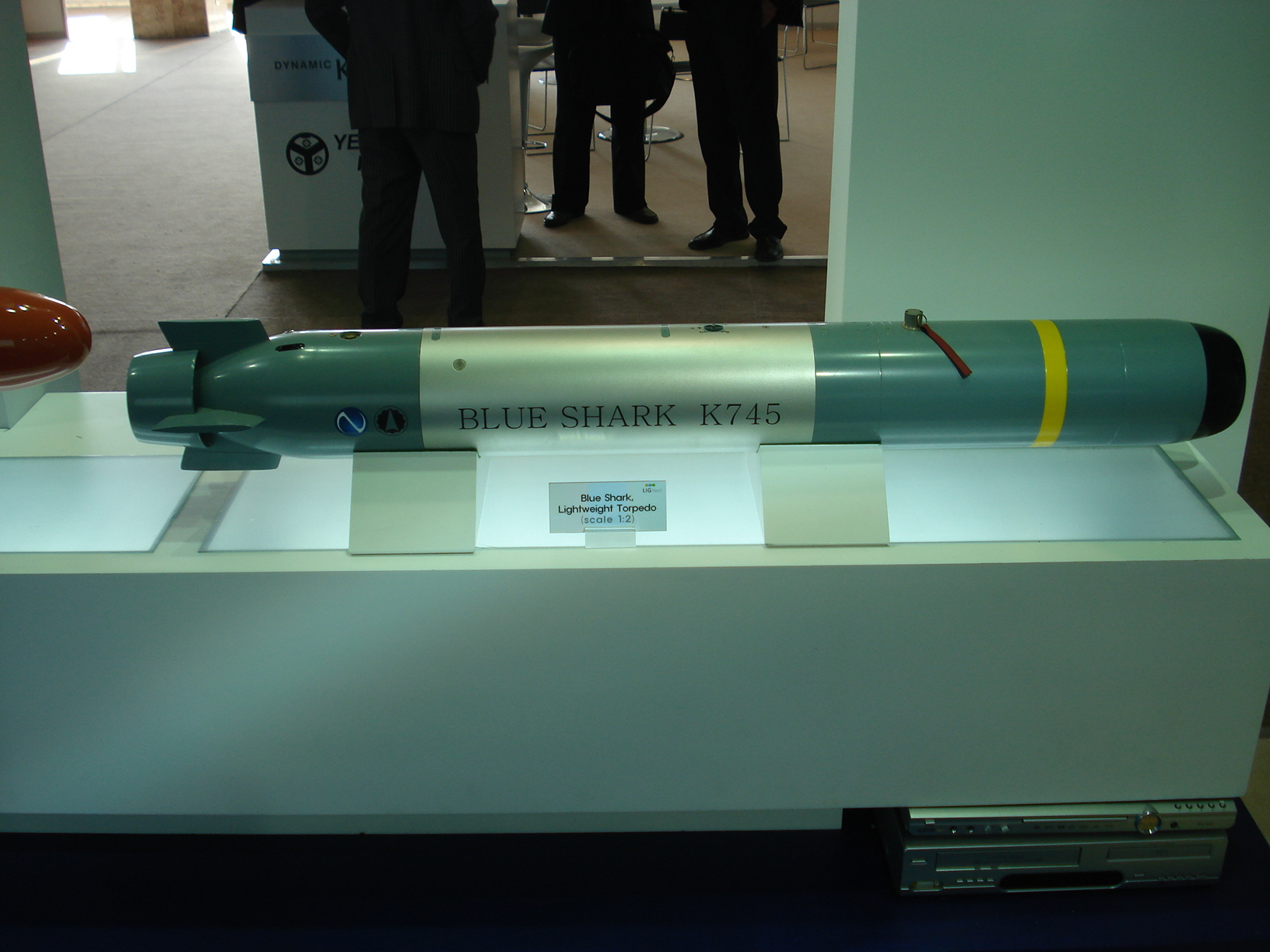
- A scale model of a Blue Shark lightweight torpedo
- Type: Lightweight ASW torpedo
- Place of origin: South Korea

Service history
- Used by: See Operators

Production history
- Designer: Agency for Defense Development
- Designed: 1995
- Manufacturer: LIG Defense & Aerospace
- Produced: 2005–present

Specifications
- Mass: 280 kg
- Length: 2.7 m
- Width: 0.32 m
- Operational range: 19 km
- Maximum speed: 45+ knots (83+ km/h)
- Guidance system: Acoustic
- Launch platform: Vessel / aircraft / helicopter

The K745 Blue Shark (Korean: 청상어; RR: Cheong-sang-eo) is a lightweight anti-submarine torpedo developed for the Republic of Korea Navy in 2004.

== Development ==
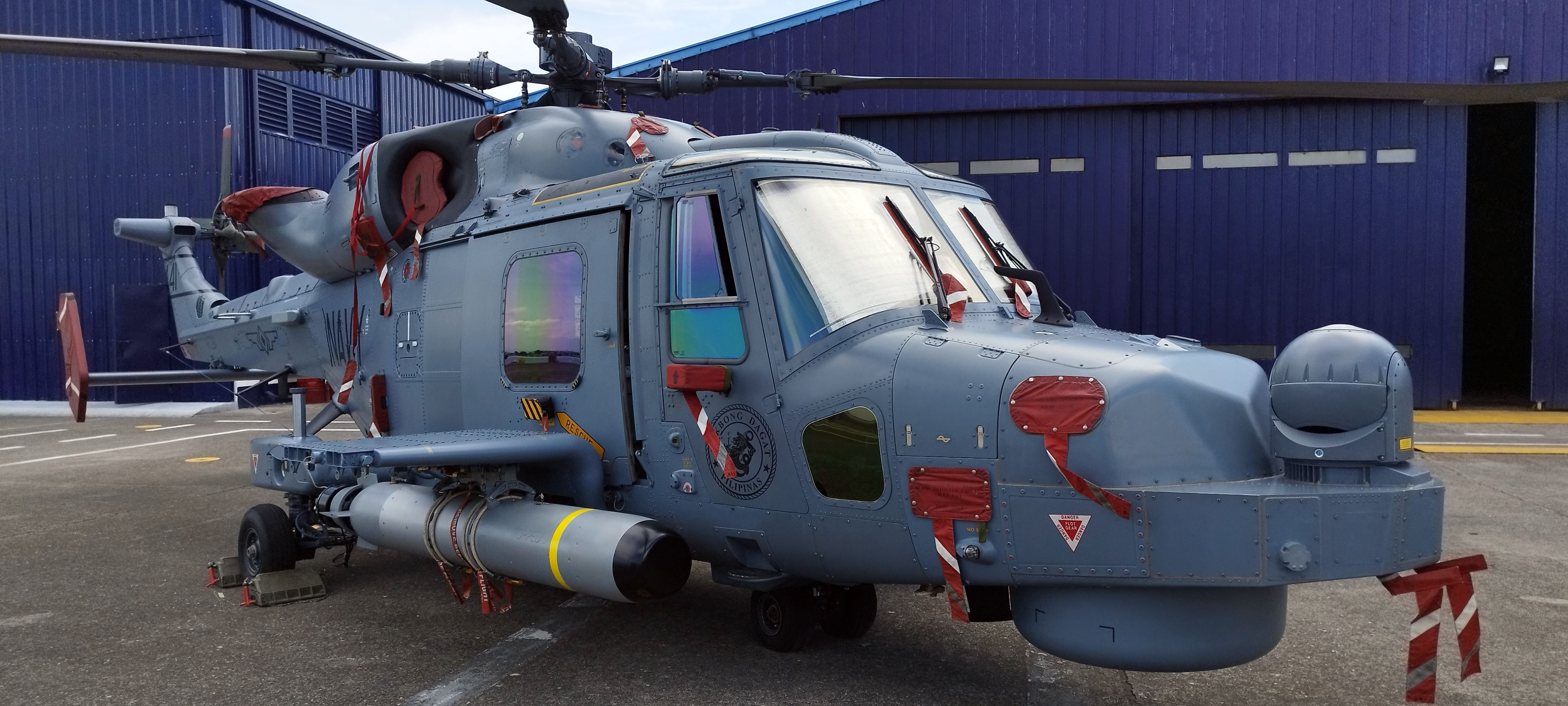
AW159 Wildcat helicopter of the Philippine Navy armed with K745 Blue Shark torpedoes taken at the Philippine Fleet Defense Expo (PFDX) 2023

The Blue Shark torpedo can be deployed from surface ships, ASW helicopters and maritime patrol aircraft. Production cost for each torpedo is about ₩ 1,000,000,000.

Blue Shark torpedoes are fitted to the Incheon, Daegu- and Chungnam classes of frigates as well as to the Sejong the Great-class of destroyers. It is exported to the Philippines as part of the acquisition process for both the Jose Rizal-class, and Miguel Malvar-class frigates and Augusta-Westland AW159 helicopters.

== Variants ==
An improved variant, the lightweight torpedo-2 is being developed by LIG Nex1. New capabilities include longer range and lesser vulnerability to decoys. The research and development program is expected to be completed in 2029.

== Operators ==
- Philippines: Philippine Navy
- South Korea: Republic of Korea Navy

== See also ==
- K731 White Shark
- K745A1 Red Shark
- K761 Tiger Shark

=== Weapons of comparable role, performance and era ===
- APR-3E torpedo - Russian equivalent
- Mark 54 Lightweight Torpedo - US Navy's equivalent
- A244-S - Italian equivalent
- MU90 Impact - French/Italian equivalent
- Sting Ray (torpedo) - British equivalent
- TAL Shyena - Indian equivalent
- Yu-7 torpedo - Chinese equivalent
- Type 97 light weight torpedo (G-RX4) - Japanese equivalent
