= SSM-700K C-Star =

South Korean anti-ship missile

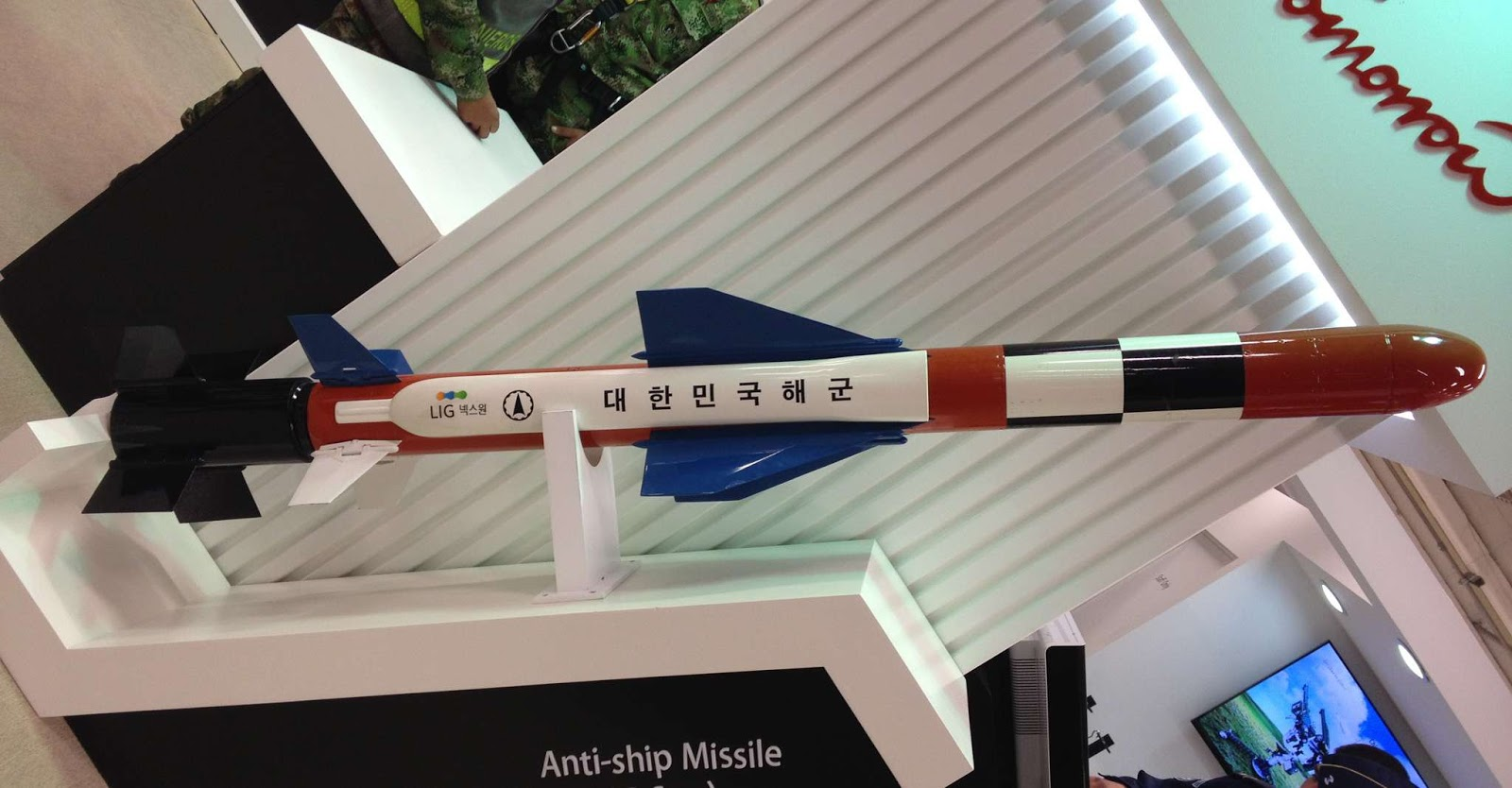
- Type: Anti-ship missile
- Place of origin: South Korea

Service history
- In service: 2006–present
- Used by: See § Users

Production history
- Designer: Agency for Defense Development; LIG Nex1; Hanwha Techwin
- Designed: 1996–2003
- Manufacturer: LIG Nex1; Samsung/Hanwha Techwin
- Unit cost: ₩2,000,000,000 (US$1.49 million)
- Produced: 2004–present

Specifications
- Mass: 792 kg (with launcher: 1,061 kg)
- Length: 5.46 m
- Diameter: 0.34 m
- Warhead weight: 250 kg
- Detonation mechanism: Impact fuze
- Engine: Hanwha Techwin SS-760K (later SSE-750K) turbojet
- Operational range: >180 kilometers (110 mi)
- Flight altitude: Sea-skimming
- Maximum speed: 1,162.8 km/h (Mach 0.95)
- Guidance system: GPS-aided inertial navigation (mid-course phase); Active radar homing (terminal phase)

The SSM-700K C-Star (Haeseong; Korean: 해성, Sea Star) is a ship-launched sea-skimming surface-to-surface anti-ship cruise missile developed by the South Korean Agency for Defense Development (ADD), LIG Nex1 and the Republic of Korea Navy in 2003. The missiles have deployed on KDX-II and KDX-III destroyers as of 2006, each carrying 8 and 16 of the missiles respectively, and on Ulsan-class frigates.

== Development history ==
During the 1970s, the Republic of Korea Navy decided to import Exocet anti-ship missiles to deter North Korea's naval provocations. Considering the fact that the Korean People's Navy was then and now mostly composed of multiple small to midsize ships, a cheap, small guided anti-ship missile was proposed. In 1978, the Korean Agency for Defense Development (ADD) started the development of the Hae Ryong anti-ship missile, and by 1987, the ROK Navy approved for the mass production of the missiles. But the Hae Ryong was fitted with a semi-active laser guidance system, limiting its tactical capability during bad weather. Additional pressure from the United States ultimately led to the project's termination.

In 1990, the problem of large proportions of the defense budget going into buying anti-ship missiles from foreign countries was brought up. The ROK Navy ordered the ADD to develop a missile that was on par with or better in performance than the Harpoon Block 1C missile. The new missile was codenamed Haeseong, and research of the following core missile technologies was started in 1996.

- Microwave seeking system
- Inertial navigation system
- Radar altimeter
- Electronic jamming system
- SS-760K turbofan engine

After 7 years of research, on August 21, 2003, the ADD successfully test fired the Haeseong and sunk the target dummy vessel. On December 20, 2005, the first production model was successfully fired from ROKS Dae Jo-yeong (DDH-977) KDX-II class destroyer.

=== Cruise missiles ===
A mid-range cruise missile, the Haeseong was developed for over-the-horizon warfare, capable of attacking targets out to 150 km (93 miles). Traveling at ultra-low sea-skimming altitudes, it uses a high-subsonic, high-capacity turbojet, with an inertial navigation system (INS) and Global Positioning System (GPS) to guide it toward its target, using a radar altimeter to maintain altitude. An active radar is used for targeting in the terminal phase immediately before impact. It was designed to be deployed in an active electronic warfare environment, fitted with both detection and countermeasures systems. The warhead itself is similar to the Harpoon, fitted with an impact or penetration fuse. The Haeseong is also suitable for shore-launched coastal defense from both fixed and mobile land platforms. The development agency claims "a 100 per cent accuracy rate in live fire tests", such as at Exercise RIMPAC.

It is reported that an unknown number of C-Star missiles were sold to Colombia.

In September 2011, South Korean defense officials confirmed the development of a supersonic cruise missile based on the Haeseong I. Haeryong (Sea Dragon), or Haeseong II, is designed as a ship-to-surface cruise missile that travels faster than Mach 1 and can evade defense systems to accurately strike ground targets, particularly North Korean missile launch pads. The missile was developed without the assistance of the United States and will not be offered for export due to restrictions of the Missile Technology Control Regime. Ships will launch the missile with the installation of vertical and slant launch systems.

Development of the Haeryong, also called the Tactical Ship to Land Missile (TSLM), was completed in 2014 and FFX-I-class frigates began operating the slant-launched (SL) version from the same inclined canister launchers that fire the anti-ship missile in 2016. Mass production of the vertical launch (VL) version, differing by the presence of a more powerful launch booster with thrust vectoring, to equip FFX-II and FFX-III-class frigates will begin in 2018 and become operational in 2019. The TSLM is equipped with a submunition warhead capable of "covering two football fields" combining a shaped charge and fragmentation jacket to penetrate armored vehicles and destroy soft targets to strike North Korean artillery and missile systems; it can be retargeted in-flight and has improved obstacle avoidance with a 200 km (120 mi) range.

There is a cruise missile called the Haeseong III designed to be launched underwater from submarines, but this is actually the designation for the Hyunmoo-3 cruise missile when launched from a submarine and is unrelated to the previous Haeseong missiles.

== Variants ==
- SSM-700K: Initial production model, with imported Ku-band seeker, SS-760K turbojet engine (based on Russian R95TP-300)
- SSM-710K: Current model with domestic Ku-band seeker, SSE-750K turbojet engine and other upgrades
- SSM-750K: Land attack version of the SSM-710K. Ku-band seeker replaced with GPS/INS guidance package

== Production ==
33 units were delivered by 2007 for the first production phase of the missile. 100 more Haeseong missiles are to be delivered to the ROK Navy by 2010.

Production phase	Production date	Production number	Notes
Phase 1	2005–2007	33	-
Phase 2	2008–2010	100+	-

== Users ==
- Colombia: Ordered in 2012 for the Almirante Padilla-class frigate.
- South Korea
- Philippines

== See also ==
- Kh-35
- Kh-59
- VCM-01
