= ROKS Jeonbuk =

ROKS Jeonbuk is the name of two Republic of Korea Navy warships:

- ROKS Jeonbuk (DD-916), a Chungbuk-class destroyer from 1972 to 1999.
- ROKS Jeonbuk (FFG-813), a Incheon-class frigate from 2015 to present.
