= ROKS Gangwon =

ROKS Gangwon is the name of three Republic of Korea Navy warships:

- ROKS Gangwon (DE-72), a Cannon-class destroyer escort from 1956 to 1977.
- ROKS Gangwon (DD-922), a Kangwon-class destroyer from 1978 to 2000.
- ROKS Gangwon (FFG-815), a Incheon-class frigate from 2015 to present.
