= ROKS Gyeonggi =

ROKS Gyeonggi is the name of three Republic of Korea Navy warships:

- ROKS Gyeonggi (DE-71), a Cannon-class destroyer escort from 1956 to 1977.
- ROKS Gyeonggi (DD-923), a Kangwon-class destroyer from 1978 to 2000.
- ROKS Gyeonggi (FFG-812), a Incheon-class frigate from 2014 to present.
