= ROKS Gwangju =

ROKS Gwangju is the name of two Republic of Korea Navy warships:

- ROKS Gwangju (DD-921), a Kangwon-class destroyer from 1977 to 2000.
- ROKS Gwangju (FFG-817), a Incheon-class frigate from 2016 to present.
