= ROKS Chungbuk =

ROKS Chungbuk is the name of two Republic of Korea Navy warships:

- ROKS Chungbuk (DD-915), a Chungbuk-class destroyer from 1972-2000.
- ROKS Chungbuk (FFG-816), a Incheon-class frigate from 2016-present.
