= Incheon-class frigate =

Class of South Korean guided-missile frigates

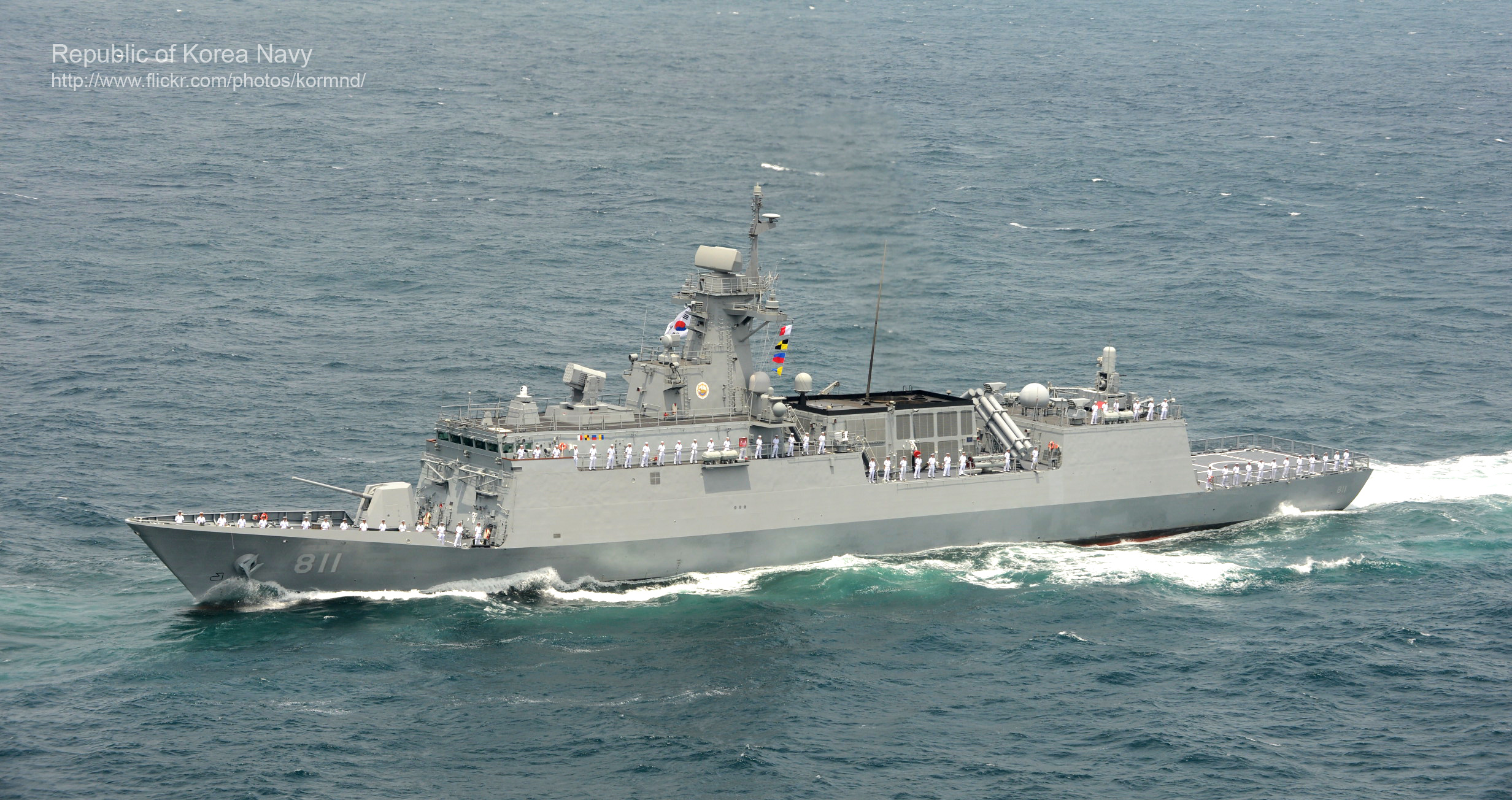
- Incheon-class frigate

Class overview
- Name: Incheon class
- Builders: Hyundai Heavy Industries; STX Offshore & Shipbuilding
- Operators: Republic of Korea Navy
- Preceded by: Ulsan class; Pohang-class corvette
- Succeeded by: Daegu class
- Subclasses: Jose Rizal class
- In commission: 2012–present
- Planned: 6
- Completed: 6
- Active: 6

General characteristics
- Type: Guided-missile frigate
- Displacement: 2,500 t (2,500 long tons) (empty); 3,300 t (3,200 long tons) (full load)
- Length: 114 m (374 ft 0 in)
- Beam: 14 m (45 ft 11 in)
- Draft: 4 m (13 ft 1 in)
- Propulsion: CODOG; 2 × MTU 12V 1163 TB83 diesel engine; 2 × GE LM2500 gas turbine
- Speed: 30 knots (56 km/h; 35 mph) (max); 18 knots (33 km/h; 21 mph) (cruising)
- Range: 4,500 nautical miles (8,300 km; 5,200 mi)
- Complement: 140
- Sensors & processing systems: SPS-550K air search 3D radar; SPG-540K fire control radar; SQS-240K hull-mounted sonar; SAQ-540K EOTS; Naval Shield Integrated Combat Management System
- Electronic warfare & decoys: LIG Nex1 SLQ-200(V)K Sonata electronic warfare suite; SLQ-261K torpedo acoustic counter measures; KDAGAIE Mk 2 decoy launchers
- Armament: 1 × 5-inch (127 mm)/L62 caliber Mk 45 Mod 4 naval gun; 1 × 20 mm Phalanx CIWS; 2 × triple torpedo tubes for K745 Blue Shark torpedo; 1 × RAM Block 1 CIWS; 8 × SSM-700K Haeseong Anti-ship Missile in quad configuration; 8 × Haeryong Tactical Land Attack Missile in quad configuration
- Aircraft carried: Super Lynx or AW159 helicopter
- Aviation facilities: Flight deck and enclosed hangar for one medium-lift helicopter

The Incheon-class frigates (Korean: 인천급 호위함, Hanja: 仁川級護衛艦), also known as the Future Frigate eXperimental or FFX during development, and latterly, the FFX-I, or FFG-I, are coastal defense frigates of the Republic of Korea Navy. The lead ship was launched on 29 April 2011. The Incheon-class frigates will replace the aging fleet of Pohang-class corvettes and Ulsan-class frigates, and take over multi-role operations such as coast patrol, anti-submarine warfare and transport support. Later batches are planned to be specialized on anti-air and anti-submarine warfare. An improved version is being introduced as the Daegu-class frigate; this was previously known as Batch II of the Incheon class, FFX-II.

== Development ==
In the early 1990s, the Korean government plan for the construction of next generation coastal ships named "Frigate 2000" was scrapped due to the 1997 Asian financial crisis. But the decommissioning of the Gearing-class destroyers and the aging fleet of Ulsan-class frigates, the plan was revived as the Future Frigate eXperimental, also known as FFX in the early 2000s.

The Republic of Korea Navy (ROKN) initially wanted twenty-four 3,000 ton frigates to replace the Ulsan-, Pohang- and Donghae-class coastal fleet of 37 ships. It was later decided that six 2,700 ton ships will be constructed for the first batch. In 2008, the plan was further downgraded to 2,300 tons when president Lee Myung-bak took office, with the number of ships for the first batch down to six. Eight ships are planned for the second batch of FFX with the final goal of 20–22 frigates.

In 2010 the construction of the first FFX frigate was awarded to Hyundai Heavy Industry and in April 2011 the first of its class, ROKS Incheon was launched. The ship is named after the western port city of Incheon, representing the ROKN's initiative to defend the western islands due to the constant clashes with the North Korean navy in this area.

== Armament ==
The Incheon-class frigate's main gun is the 127 mm/L62 Mk. 45 Mod 4 naval gun. This was chosen over a smaller 76 mm for naval barrage support in amphibious landings and superiority in ship to ship firing. Point-defense armaments include a single 20 mm Phalanx CIWS and a RIM-116 Rolling Airframe Missile Block 1 21-round launcher. The anti-submarine warfare armaments consists of K745 LW Cheong Sahng-uh (Blue Shark) torpedoes.

Anti-ship capability is provided by SSM-700K Haeseong (Sea Star) long-range anti-ship missiles, each with performance similar to the American Harpoon. Land-attack capability is provided by the recently developed Tactical Ship to Land attack missile, which is derived from the SSM-700K Haeseong; initially, the land attack missiles were planned to start arming batch 2 Incheon-class ships, but feasibility studies showed they could be retrofitted to batch 1 ships, which began in September 2016, enhancing their flexibility and deterrence capabilities with 150–200 km (93–124 mi)-range tactical missiles.

== Ships in the class ==
Name	Pennant number	Builder	Launched	Commissioned	Status
ROKS Incheon	FFG-811	Hyundai Heavy Industries	29 April 2011	17 January 2013	Active
ROKS Gyeonggi	FFG-812	Hyundai Heavy Industries	18 July 2013	4 November 2014	Active
ROKS Jeonbuk	FFG-813	Hyundai Heavy Industries	13 November 2013	5 January 2015	Active
ROKS Gangwon	FFG-815	STX Offshore & Shipbuilding	12 August 2014	November 2015	Active
ROKS Chungbuk	FFG-816	STX Offshore & Shipbuilding	23 October 2014	26 January 2016	Active
ROKS Gwangju	FFG-817	STX Offshore & Shipbuilding	11 August 2015	9 November 2016	Active

== Export market ==
A variant of the Incheon class was offered by Hyundai Heavy Industries to the Philippines' Department of National Defense for their requirement of two new frigates. On 24 October 2016, the contract to supply two brand new general purpose stealth frigates was signed between the Department of National Defense, represented by Defense Sec. Delfin Lorenzana, and Hyundai Heavy Industries, represented by its Senior Vice President Mr. Ki Sun Chung, under the presence of officials from the DND, AFP, PN, HHI, and the South Korean Ambassador to the Philippines.

In November 2012, it was reported that Israel was mulling a deal to purchase four Incheon-class frigates from South Korea, which would be built jointly by Hyundai Heavy Industries and Israel Shipyards.

== See also ==
- List of frigate classes in service

Equivalent frigates of the same era

- Formidable class
- Type 054
- Valour class
- Project 11356R
- Fridtjof Nansen class
- Absalon class
