= K Shipbuilding =

South Korean shipbuilding company

K Shipbuilding Co., Ltd.
- Native name: 주식회사 케이조선
- Formerly: STX Offshore & Shipbuilding
- Type: Public
- Industry: Shipbuilding
- Founded: April 1967; 59 years ago
- Headquarters: Changwon, South Korea
- Products: LNG/LPG, Container, Tanker, FPSO/FSU, Drill-ship, Fixed Platform & Naval Ships
- Website: www.kshipbuilding.com

K Shipbuilding Co., Ltd. (Korean: 주식회사 케이조선), formerly STX Offshore & Shipbuilding, is a South Korean shipbuilding company. The company was named Daedong Shipbuilding before being acquired by STX. K Shipbuilding was once the world's fourth-largest shipbuilder but entered a creditor-led workout program in 2013. It was delisted in 2014 and went into court receivership in 2016 and 2017.

In 2021, a consortium led by United Asset Management Company (UAMCO) and KH Investment (KHI), purchased STX Offshoring & Shipbuilding for KRW 250 billion (US$ 220 million) from the creditor, including Korea Development Bank. STX O&S was rebranded as K Shipbuilding after the ownership change.

== See also ==
- STX Corporation
- STX Europe
  - STX Finland
  - STX France
