= Donghae-class corvette =

Ship class

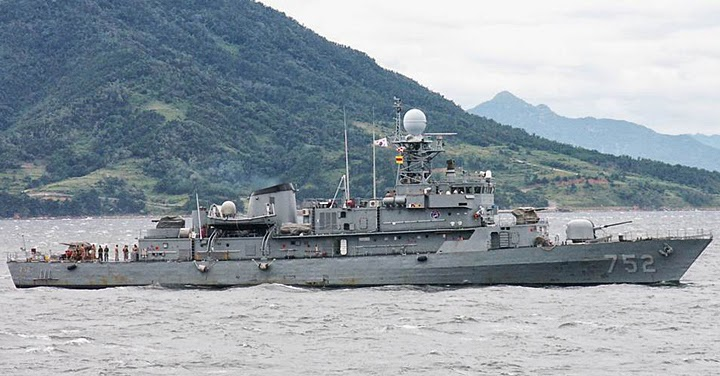
- ROKS Suwon (PCC-752) underway

Class overview
- Name: Donghae class
- Operators: Republic of Korea Navy; Colombian National Navy
- Succeeded by: Pohang class
- In commission: 10 November 1983 - present
- Completed: 4
- Active: 1 Colombian National Navy
- Retired: 3

General characteristics
- Type: Corvette
- Displacement: Empty: 890 t; Full: 1076 t
- Length: 78.5 m (257 ft 7 in)
- Beam: 10 m (32 ft 10 in)
- Draft: 2.9 m (9 ft 6 in)
- Propulsion: CODOG; 1 x GE LM2500 gas turbine engine; 2 x MTU 12V 956 TB82 diesel engine
- Speed: Maximum: 31 knots (57 km/h); Cruising: 15 knots (28 km/h)
- Range: 4,000 nautical miles (7,400 km)
- Crew: 95
- Sensors & processing systems: Fire control system: Signaal SEWACO ZK; Surface search radar: Raytheon 1645; Fire control radar: Signaal WM28; Optronic director: Signaal LIOD; Sonar: EDO 786
- Electronic warfare & decoys: Mk 36 SRBOC; GoldStar ULQ-12K ESM
- Armament: Primary gun: 1 x OTO Melara 76 mm/62 cannon; Secondary gun: 2 x Emerson EMERLEC 30 twin Oerlikon 30 mm/75 KCB cannon; 1 × twin Bofors 40 mm L/60 cannon (before 1990); 1 × twin Bofors 40 mm L/60K cannon (after 1990); Anti-submarine: 2 x triple Mark 32 SVTT loaded with; Mark 46 ASW torpedo, or; K745 Blue Shark ASW torpedo (after 2006); 12 x Mk 9 or KMk 9 depth charge

The Donghae-class PCC (Patrol Combat Corvette) (Korean: 동해급 초계함; Hanja: 東海級哨戒艦) is the low-end complement of the high-low mix domestic naval construction plan of the Republic of Korea Navy under the 1st Yulgok Project (1974-1986) for the Republic of Korea Armed Forces. The ship is designed for patrolling maritime border, including the Northern Limit Line, protecting the littoral zone, and combating the North Korean vessels.

Since 1983, a total of 4 Donghae-class corvettes commissioned in the Republic of Korea Navy. The decommission of the class started in 2009, and is being replaced with series of FFX program. As of 2021, only 1 remains in service with the Colombian Navy.

== Development ==
Prior to the Donghae-class, the Republic of Korea Navy operated ex-US warships of similar role and size built during the World War II, which the ships were in imminent retirement condition in 1980. Meanwhile, the lead ship of Ulsan-class frigate was under construction; the new frigate project, being the priority of the ROKN, took up most of the budget. Therefore, the ROKN planned a small cost-efficient yet heavily armed patrol vessel that can support Ulsan-class by providing numeric advantage as low-end platform.

Since the ROKN was heavily involved in anti-espionage missions and patrolling the maritime border, ship stability became the most important factor in designing the ship. From the ships operated by the ROKN, the Noryang-class PCEC (Patrol Craft Escort & Combatant) (ex-PCE-842-class) had the best size for the mission, and the Sinseong-class PCE (Patrol Craft Escort) (ex-Auk-class MSF), which had U-shape hull, showed the best ship stability at the patrol speed (5-8 knots). The hull design was contested by the ROKN officer Captain Eom Do-jae, the supervisor of the Ulsan-class frigate, for V-shape for better speed-length ratio. However, the V-shape required installation of fin stabilizers; the ROKN's distrust on the fin stabilizer from the experience of Baekgu-class PGM (Patrol Gunboat Motor) (modified Asheville-class) lead to continue with the U-shape design.

The ship was originally planned for 25 kn using combined diesel and diesel (CODAD) system. However, the requirement was increased to 30 kn after combined diesel or gas (CODOG) was considered. General Electric LM2500 was chosen over Rolls-Royce Marine Spey for higher power to achieve speed requirement despite Rolls-Royce type engine was proven for its survivability by HMS Sheffield during the Falkland War.

During sea trial, ROKS Donghae experienced cavitation on its propellers at 110 to 140 rpm, which was critical in performing anti-submarine warfare. ROKS Donghae applied changes on the propellers along with three sister ships on construction in other shipyards.

After constructing four Donghae-class, the hull shape dispute sparked again for the next production. As a result, change to V-shape hull also changed the ship class to the Pohang-class for Batch II and further productions.

== General characteristics ==
The Donghae-class is powered by one General Electric LM2500 gas turbine engine and two MTU Friedrichshafen 12V 956 TB82 diesel engines for combined diesel or gas (CODOG) propulsion system, which allows full displacement of 1,076 t ship to move at 31 kn maximum and 15 kn cruising speed. The main armament is focused on surface combat to counter numerous and small North Korean ships, which is controlled by Signaal SEWACO ZK fire control system combined with Raytheon 1645 surface-search radar, Signaal WM28 fire-control radar, and Signaal LIOD optronic director. For anti-submarine mission, the ship has installed EDO 786 sonar and armed with 2 x triple Mark 32 Surface Vessel Torpedo Tubes firing Mark 46 torpedo.

The armaments consist 1 x OTO Melara 76 mm/62 cannon, 2 x Emerson EMERLEC 30 twin Oerlikon 30 mm/75 KCB cannon, and 1 x twin Bofors 40 mm L/60 cannon. However, the ship lacks air-search radar along with anti-air weapon, which was the biggest topic among the militaries of the world as a result of the Falklands War, due to low on budget. The ship has limited defense capability against air and missile attack, only assisted by GoldStar ULQ-12K ESM (electronic support measures) and Mk 36 SRBOC (Super Rapid Bloom Offboard Countermeasures).

== Operation history ==
On 11:15 PM of 17 December 1998, an army private found a North Korean semi-submarine near Yeosu using TOD. ROKS Donghae joined the operation that sunk the submarine.

In 1990, twin Bofors 40 mm L/60 cannon received upgrade to Bofors 40 mm L60K during regular maintenance; upgraded cannon mount is linked to the fire control system and can be operated at night.

== Ships in class by country ==
=== Republic of Korea Navy ===
Name	Hull Number	Builder	Launched	Delivered	Commissioned	Decommissioned	Status
Batch I
ROKS Donghae	PCC-751	Korea Shipbuilding Corporation	18 November 1982	10 November 1983	21 December 1983	30 June 2009	Disposed as a target ship during fleet exercise.
ROKS Suwon	PCC-752	Korea Tacoma Shipyard	18 December 1982	20 November 1983	21 December 1983	30 June 2010	Scrapped.
ROKS Gangneung	PCC-753	Hyundai Heavy Industries	14 May 1983	1 December 1983	21 December 1983	30 June 2010	Scrapped.
ROKS Anyang	PCC-755	Daewoo Shipbuilding	15 June 1983	15 December 1983	21 December 1983	29 September 2011	Transferred to the Colombian Navy as CM-55 ARC Nariño.

=== Colombian National Navy ===
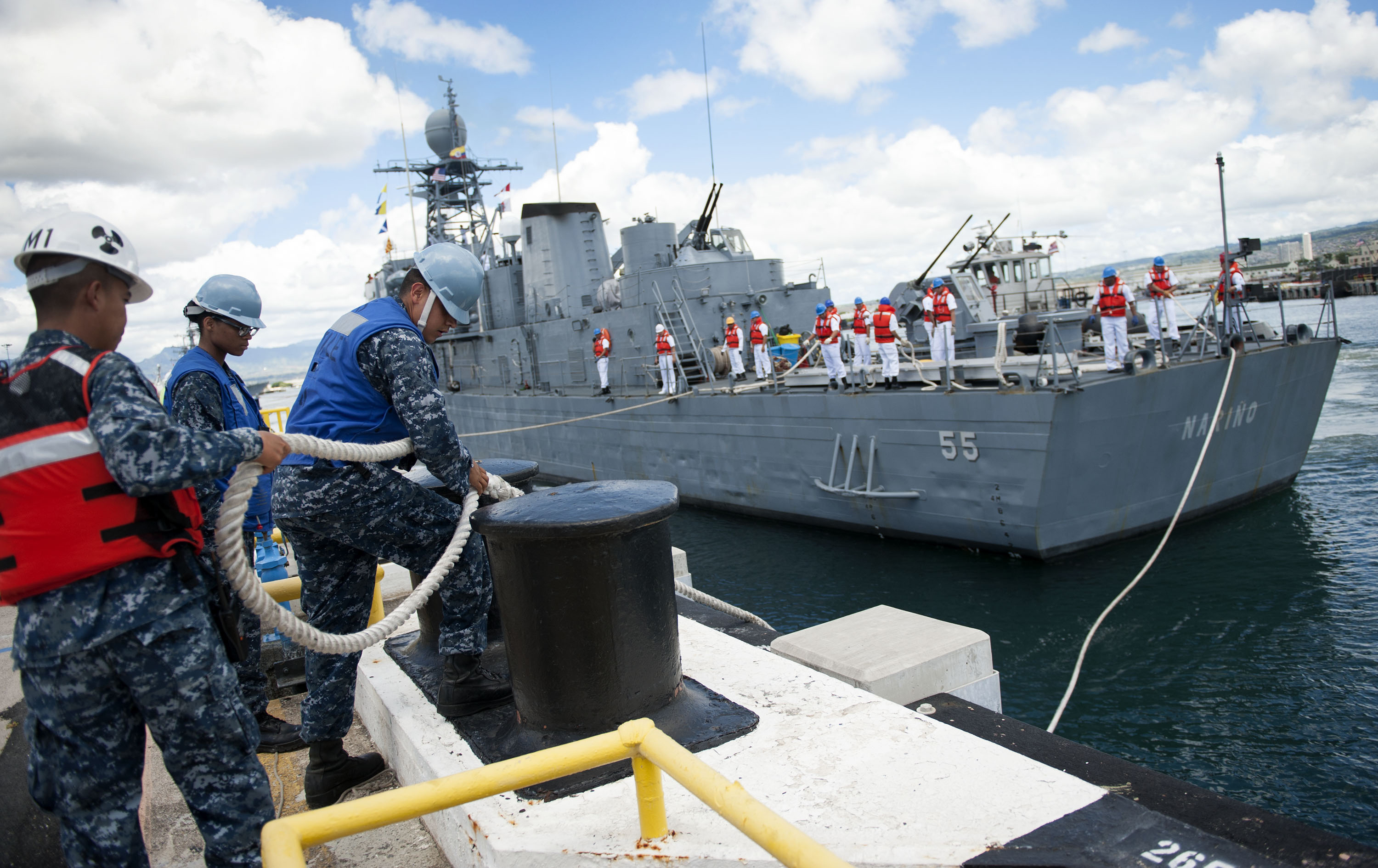
Colombian navy ARC Nariño arrives for Pearl Harbor port visit.

In September 2012, the Colombian Navy requested transfer of decommissioned corvette. The Pohang-class ROKS Gunsan was offered by the Republic of Korea Navy, but the Colombian Navy chose ROKS Anyang after the inspection. Formal contract for transfer was signed on 23 July 2013. In October, the ship began the refurbishment for 9 months. The main armament, OTO Melara 76 mm/62 cannon, was removed for additional twin Bofors 40 mm L/60K. The training of crew began in April 2014 at South Korea. On 30 July, the ceremony for first voyage was held, and the ship sailed off to Colombia.

Name	Hull Number	Builder	Launched	Delivered	Commissioned	Decommissioned	Status
ARC Nariño	CM-55	Daewoo Shipbuilding	15 June 1983	23 July 2013			Active

== See also ==
- Pohang-class corvette
- List of corvette classes
