= South Korea and weapons of mass destruction =

Republic of Korea
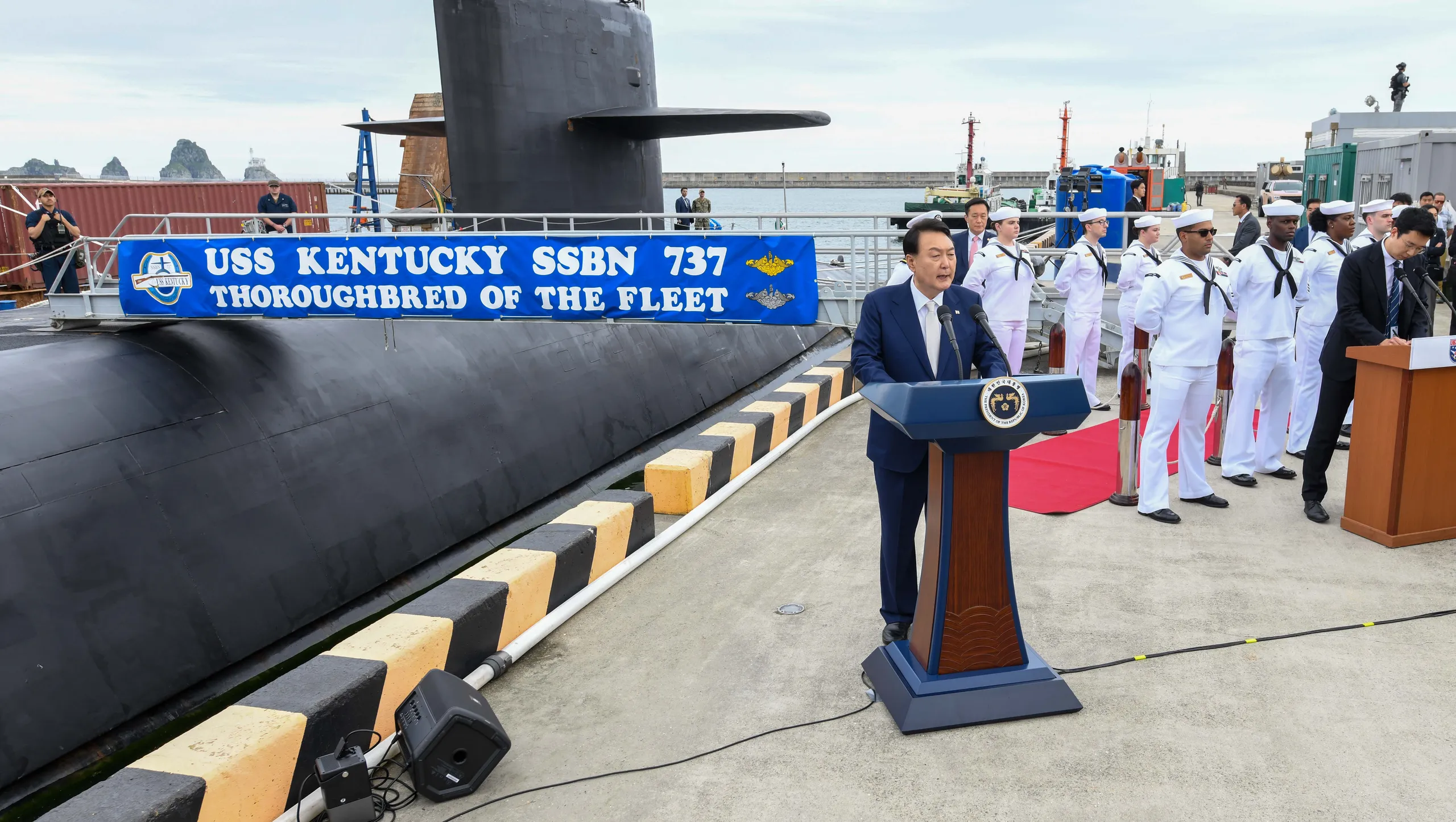
- Former president Yoon Suk Yeol in front of the nuclear-armed USS Kentucky temporarily docked at Busan Naval Base, July 2023, the only time South Korea has hosted nuclear weapons since the end of the Cold War.

- Nuclear program start date: 1970
- Nuclear program end date: 1981
- NPT party: Yes (joined 1975)
- Related institutions: Korea Atomic Energy Research Institute
- Nuclear weapons stationing start date: 1958
- Nuclear weapons stationing provider: United States
- Peak nuclear weapons stationed: 950
- Nuclear weapons stationing end date: 1991

The United States stationed various nuclear weapons and their delivery systems in South Korea between 1958 and 1991. South Korea actively pursued a nuclear weapons program from 1970 to 1981, primarily under military dictator Park Chung Hee. South Korea signed the Non-Proliferation Treaty in 1975 but conducted illegal nuclear weapons-related experiments until 2000. South Korea benefits from the United States' nuclear umbrella as part of the countries' close alliance. South Korea is a ratifier of the Biological Weapons Convention and Chemical Weapons Convention, disposing of its Cold War-era chemical weapons stockpile by 2008. South Korea's policy on weapons of mass destruction is heavily influenced by its perception of North Korea's nuclear and chemical weapons.

South Korea has the resources, equipment, and technical ability to quickly develop a nuclear weapons capability, a status known as nuclear latency. This includes an advanced nuclear power industry, and the Hyunmoo series of ballistic and cruise missiles; South Korea is the only non-nuclear-armed country to possess submarine-launched ballistic missiles. North Korea has possessed nuclear weapons since its first nuclear test in 2006 and continues to test nuclear-capable missiles.

South Korean policy maintains non-proliferation of nuclear weapons and the goal of a nuclear-free Korean Peninsula. However, as of 2023, a majority of South Koreans consistently favor nuclear weapons development, and politicians have expressed consideration for such a program.

In August 2004, South Korea revealed the extent of its highly secretive and sensitive nuclear research programs to the International Atomic Energy Agency (IAEA), including some experiments which were conducted without the obligatory reporting to the IAEA called for by South Korea's safeguards agreement. The IAEA Secretariat reported the failure to report to IAEA Board of Governors. However, the IAEA Board of Governors decided to not make a formal finding of noncompliance.

== Nuclear weapons ==
=== Early nuclear ambitions ===
When the United States notified the South Korean administration of its plan to withdraw USFK in July 1970, South Korea first considered the possibility of an independent nuclear program. Under the direction of South Korea's Weapons Exploitation Committee, the country attempted to obtain plutonium reprocessing facilities following the pullout of the 26,000 American soldiers of the 7th Infantry Division in 1971. After South Vietnam had fallen in April 1975, then South Korean president Park Chung Hee first mentioned its nuclear weapons aspiration during the press conference on 12 June 1975. However, under pressure from the United States, France eventually decided not to deliver a reprocessing facility to South Korea in 1975. South Korea's nuclear weapons research program effectively ended on April 23, 1975, with its ratification of the Nuclear Non-Proliferation Treaty. According to a 2017 literature review of worldwide nuclear programs, South Korea actively pursued nuclear weapons from 1970 to 1981, first exploring the possibility in 1969.

=== Post-NPT programs ===
==== Previously unreported experiments ====
In 1982, scientists at the Korean Atomic Energy Research Institute performed an experiment in which they extracted several milligrams of plutonium. Although plutonium has uses other than the manufacture of weapons, the United States later insisted that South Korea not attempt to reprocess plutonium in any way. In exchange, the US agreed to transfer reactor technology and give financial assistance to South Korea's nuclear energy program. It was revealed in 2004 that some South Korean scientists continued some studies; for example, in 1983 and 1984 Korea Atomic Energy Research Institute was conducting chemical experiments related to the handling of spent fuel that crossed the reprocessing boundary.

Later, in an experiment at the same facility in 2000, scientists enriched 200 milligrams of uranium to near-weapons grade (up to 77 percent) using laser enrichment. The South Korean government claimed that this research was conducted without its knowledge. While uranium enriched to 77 percent is usually not considered weapons-grade, it could theoretically be used to construct a nuclear weapon. Highly enriched uranium with a purity of 20% or more is usable in a weapon, but this route is less desirable as far more material is required to obtain critical mass.

These events went unreported to the IAEA until late 2004.

==== IAEA response ====
Following Seoul's disclosure of the above incidents, the IAEA launched a full investigation into South Korea's nuclear activities. In a report issued on November 11, 2004, the IAEA described the South Korean government's failure to report its nuclear activities a matter of "serious concern", but accepted that these experiments never produced more than very small amounts of weaponizable fissile material. The Board of Governors decided to not make a formal finding of noncompliance, and the matter was not referred to the Security Council.

Pierre Goldschmidt, former head of the department of safeguards at the IAEA, has called on the Board of Governors to adopt generic resolutions which would apply to all states in such circumstances and has argued "political considerations played a dominant role in the board's decision" to not make a formal finding of non-compliance.

=== American nuclear weapons in South Korea ===
Deployment of US atomic weapons in Korea in 1958

The US first deployed nuclear weapons to South Korea in 1958, and withdrew them in 1991. Numbers peaked in the late 1960s at close to 950, including a mix of tactical and strategic weapons. In July 2023, the USS Kentucky nuclear-armed ballistic missile submarine made a port call at Busan Naval Base, temporarily returning nuclear weapons to South Korea for the first time in 32 years.

Following its accession to the Nuclear Non-Proliferation Treaty in 1985, the government of North Korea had cited the presence of US tactical nuclear weapons in South Korea as a reason to avoid completing a safeguards agreement with the International Atomic Energy Agency. In 1991, President George H W Bush announced the withdrawal of all naval and land-based tactical nuclear weapons deployed abroad, including approximately 100 such weapons based in South Korea. In January 1992, the governments of North and South Korea signed a Joint Declaration of the Denuclearization of the Korean Peninsula, and in January 1992, the North concluded a comprehensive safeguards agreement with the IAEA. Implementation meetings for the Joint Declaration took place in 1992 and 1993, but no agreement could be found, so consequently the declaration never entered into force.

In 2013, South Korean Prime Minister Chung Hong-won rejected calls to again station American tactical nuclear weapons in South Korea.

In 2017, during a period of unusually high tension with North Korea, South Korean defence minister Song Young-moo suggested it was worth reviewing the redeployment of U.S. nuclear weapons to the Korean Peninsula.

Yoon Suk-yeol, President of South Korea at the time, stated in 2021 that he would ask the United States to redeploy tactical nuclear weapons in South Korea.

In 2023, South Korea agreed not to develop nuclear weapons in exchange for American deployment of nuclear-armed submarines in South Korea.

=== Russian nuclear program proposal ===
In 2025, a South Korean declassified document confirmed that Russia offered nuclear programs to repay debt inherited from the Soviet Union. In 1992, Russia offered advanced nuclear and plant life-extending technology. In 1994, Russia offered 50 tons of highly enriched uranium originating from Ukrainian nuclear warheads plus 150 tons of low-enriched uranium annually for 10 years.

=== Public opinion ===
In the late 1990s, a notable minority of South Koreans supported the country's effort to reprocess materials, although only a small number called for the government to obtain nuclear weapons.

With the escalation of the 2017 North Korea crisis, amid worries that the United States might hesitate to defend South Korea from a North Korean attack for fear of inviting a missile attack against the United States, public opinion turned strongly in favour of a South Korean nuclear arsenal, with polls showing that 60% of South Koreans supported building nuclear weapons.

In a 2023 poll, over 76% of South Koreans support the indigenous development of nuclear weapons.

=== Nuclear-capable state ===
Although currently, South Korea is under the US nuclear umbrella of protection, it could very well break away and try to develop its own nuclear weapons if necessary. Like Japan, South Korea has the raw materials, technology, and resources to create nuclear weapons. Previous incidents show the Republic of Korea (ROK) to be able to possess nuclear weapons in anywhere from one to three years if necessary. The ROK has been shown before to create enriched uranium up to 77%, which, although not particularly powerful, shows that South Korea has the potential to make nuclear weapons with more highly enriched uranium. South Korea does not have any intercontinental ballistic missiles but possesses a wide range of short-range and medium-range ballistic missiles through the Hyunmoo series of ballistic/cruise missiles currently fielded by the ROK Army and the ROK Navy. The Hyunmoo series of ballistic/cruise missiles works similarly to the American Tomahawk Missile, which can be armed with the W80 and W84 nuclear warheads. Theoretically, if needed, the 500 kg conventional warhead could be replaced by a small nuclear warhead. The Hyunmoo missiles can already cover the entire range of North Korea and would drastically change the North's disposition if the South had nuclear-armed MRBM/LACMs. Even though the ROK could procure nuclear weapons, currently like Japan, it sees no reason to do so with the protection of the American nuclear arsenal. However, if a conflict erupts with the North, South Korea could quickly evolve into a nuclear-armed state and pose even with the North with the support of the US. According to Suh Kune-yull, a professor of nuclear engineering at Seoul National University, "If we decide to stand on our own feet and put our resources together, we can build nuclear weapons in six months".

South Korean president Yoon Suk Yeol stated in January 2023 that if the security situation regarding the threat from North Korean nuclear weapons deteriorates further, South Korea would consider building their own nuclear weapons to deter the North or request that the United States deploy nuclear weapons in South Korea. In 1991 the United States removed all of its nuclear weapons from South Korea. The statements from the South Korean president came during a policy briefing by his foreign and defense ministries; the comments are the first time South Korea has officially acknowledged they would consider developing its own nuclear arsenal in response to North Korean nuclear weapons.

In 2022 South Korea announced it had developed submarine-launched ballistic missiles, Hyunmoo-4-4; South Korea is the only nation with SLBMs that does not possess nuclear weapons.

In February 2023, the leader of the People Power Party, Chung Jin Suk said that South Korea might need nuclear weapons.

In March 2023, Mayor of Seoul Oh Se-hoon called for South Korea to have nuclear weapons.

=== Delivery systems ===
South Korea missile development originates in 1970 with creation of Defense Ministry's Agency of Defense Development with development starting in 1971 under orders of then President Park Chung Hee.

In 1970 South Korea was allowed to service MIM-23 Hawk and MIM-14 Nike Hercules surface-to-air missiles under agreement with maintenance facilities under the supervision of the U.S. which was set up in the country with South Korean engineers receiving training from Raytheon and U.S. military involving improvement of the missiles.

In 1975 South Korea purchased mixer for missiles' solid fuel propellant from Lockheed along with some equipment imported later on. 1978 marked the first successful ballistic missile test of the first South Korean SRBM NHK-1(also known as White/Polar Bear) conducted on September 26, demonstrating 160 km range with maximum range of 180 to 200 km. NHK-1 was touted by South Korea as a completely indigenous development, though in fact some of the technology was supplied and obtained from the United States.

Seoul agreed to not extended range of the missile beyond 180 km under South Korea Ballistic Missile Range Guidelines with the U.S. with development of its successor NHK-2 that was tested in October 1982 with development being halted in 1984 until its resumption a couple years later with its completion in 1987 when it entered service, its guidance system was supplied by United Kingdom. In 1995 South Korea requested permission to have 300 km range missiles from the US in line with MTCR with request in 1999 for expansion to 500 km. Development of 300 km range Hyunmoo-2 started in mid to late 1990s with first test in April 1999 with entering service in 2008 as Hyunmoo-2A after restrictions were lifted from previous agreement to limitation comparable to MTCR, Hyunmoo-2B entered service in 2009 with range under MTCR-like restriction as well as range restriction under South Korea Ballistic Missile Range Guidelines renegotiated in 2012 with the US from 300 km to 800 km with reduced payload from 997 kg to 500 kg. The cap on missile warhead weight was lifted in 2017.

On May 21, 2021, the decades-old South Korea Ballistic Missile Range Guidelines was scrapped, allowing South Korea to develop and possess any type of missile, including intercontinental ballistic missiles (ICBMs) and advanced submarine-launched ballistic missiles (SLBMs).

== Chemical weapons ==
South Korea formerly held a chemical weapons stockpile of 3,000–3,500 metric tons (3,300–3,900 short tons) but disposed of it by July 2008.

South Korea signed the Chemical Weapons Convention in 1993 and ratified it in 1997.

== Biological weapons ==
South Korea signed the Biological Weapons Convention in 1972 and ratified it in 1987.

=== Allegations in the Korean War ===
Allegations that the United States military used biological weapons in the Korean War (June 1950 – July 1953) were raised by the governments of the People's Republic of China, the Soviet Union, and North Korea. China and North Korea also made allegations that US forces used chemical weapons. No other countries, nor any body not affiliated or allied with the Soviet Union, have confirmed or raised those concerns. The primary evidence for the claims were obtained via torture on two US pilots, who recanted the claims after release. The International Red Cross and World Health Organization ruled out biological warfare being deployed in the Korean war.

The claims were first raised in 1951, and made broad claims of use of anti-personnel, anti-crop, and anti-animal pathogens, including the causative agents of anthrax, plague, smallpox, and typhoid fever. The story was covered by the worldwide press and led to a highly publicized, Soviet backed international investigation in 1952. Secretary of State Dean Acheson and other American and allied government officials denounced the allegations as a hoax.

== See also ==
- International Atomic Energy Agency
- North Korea nuclear weapons program
- Nuclear power in South Korea
- Nuclear Non-Proliferation Treaty
- South Korea Ballistic Missile Range Guidelines
- Timeline of the North Korean nuclear program
- ko:대한민국의 핵무기 개발
- ko:대한민국의 독자 핵무장론
