= ROKS Sohn Won-yil =

Sohn Won-yil-class submarine

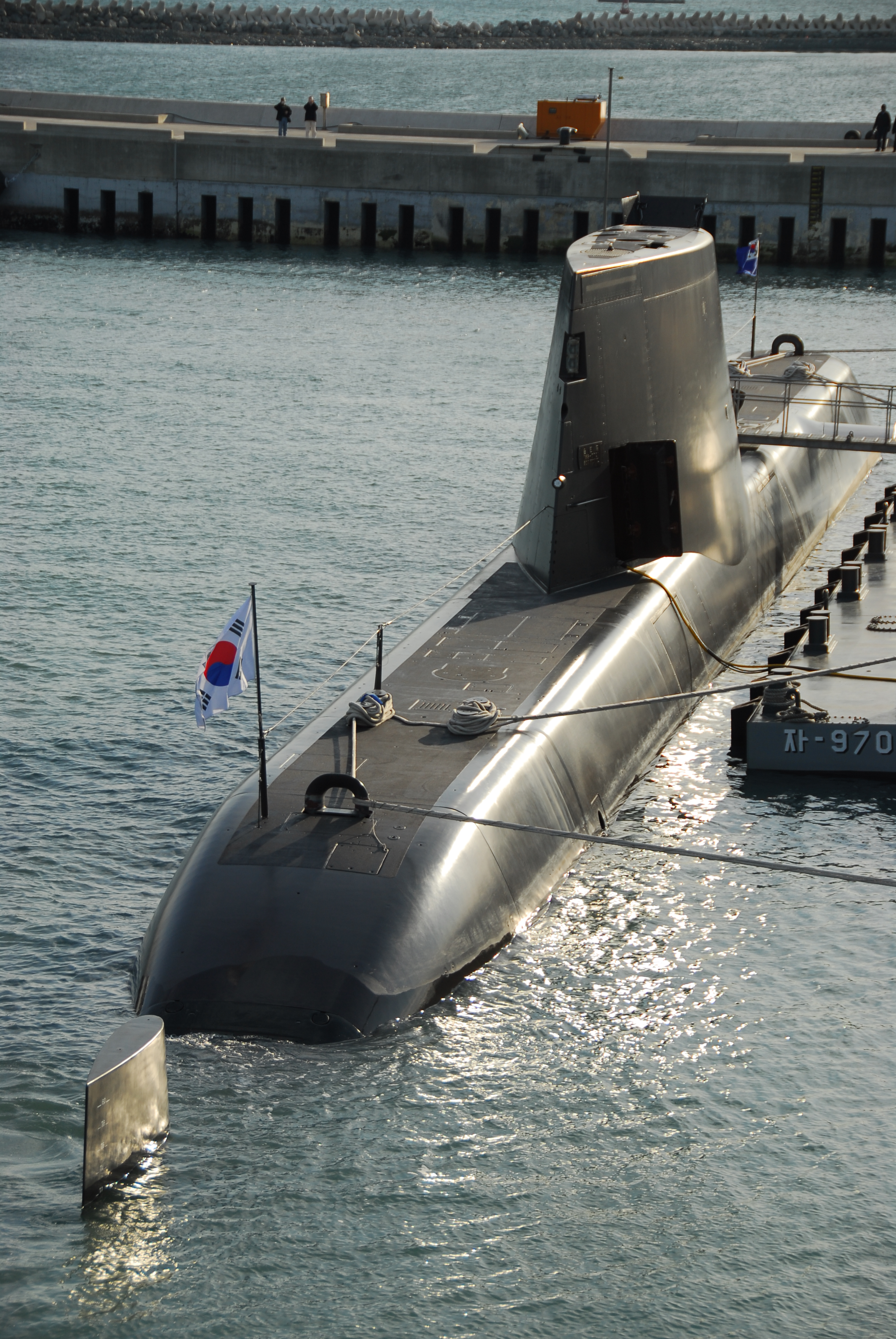
- ROKS Sohn Won-yil during Foal Eagle 2008

History

South Korea
- Name: Sohn Won-yil; (손원일)
- Namesake: Sohn Won-yil
- Builder: Hyundai
- Laid down: October 2002
- Launched: 9 June 2006
- Acquired: 26 December 2007
- Commissioned: 28 December 2007
- Identification: Pennant number: SS-072
- Status: Active

General characteristics
- Class & type: Sohn Won-yil-class submarine
- Displacement: 1,690 t (1,660 long tons) (surfaced); 1,860 t (1,830 long tons) (submerged)
- Length: 65 m (213 ft 3 in)
- Beam: 6.3 m (20 ft 8 in)
- Draught: 6 m (19 ft 8 in)
- Propulsion: Diesel-electric, fuel cell AIP, low noise skew back propeller
- Speed: 12 knots (22 km/h; 14 mph) surfaced; 20 knots (37 km/h; 23 mph) submerged
- Range: 12,000 nmi (22,000 km; 14,000 mi) (surfaced); 420 nmi (780 km; 480 mi) at 8 knots (15 km/h; 9.2 mph) (submerged); 1,248 nmi (2,311 km; 1,436 mi) at 4 knots (7.4 km/h; 4.6 mph) (submerged)
- Endurance: 84 days
- Test depth: nearly 400 m (1,300 ft)
- Complement: 5 officers + 22 crew
- Armament: 8 × 533 mm (21.0 in) torpedo tubes; 4 Sub-Harpoon missile-capable

ROKS Sohn Won-yil (SS-072) is the lead boat of the Sohn Won-yil-class submarine in the Republic of Korea Navy. She is named after the admiral, Sohn Won-yil.

== Design ==
There are media reports that the Sohn Won-yil is equipped with eight 533 mm torpedo tubes, and that South Korea will mount a Korean Tomahawk missile, Hyunmoo-3, with a range of 500 km. It is said that they are also developing versions with a range of 1000 km and 1500 km, but there was no confirmation of whether this version could be mounted on a 533mm torpedo tube. Originally, the American Tomahawk missile was conceptually designed to be launched from a 533mm torpedo tube. Korea has also recently succeeded in localizing it.

The Cheonryong missile with a range of 500 km has been installed in the Sohn Won-yil-class and has been deployed and is in operation.

Germany, which exported the Sohn Won-yil-class (class 214), is using a Type 212 submarine that uses the same AIP system with the same displacement. It has a range of 20 km, and is equipped with four 533 mm torpedo tube, and is capable against air, surface, and submarine targets.

== Construction and career ==
ROKS Sohn Won-yil was launched on 9 June 2006 by Hyundai Heavy Industries and commissioned on 28 December 2007.

== Gallery ==
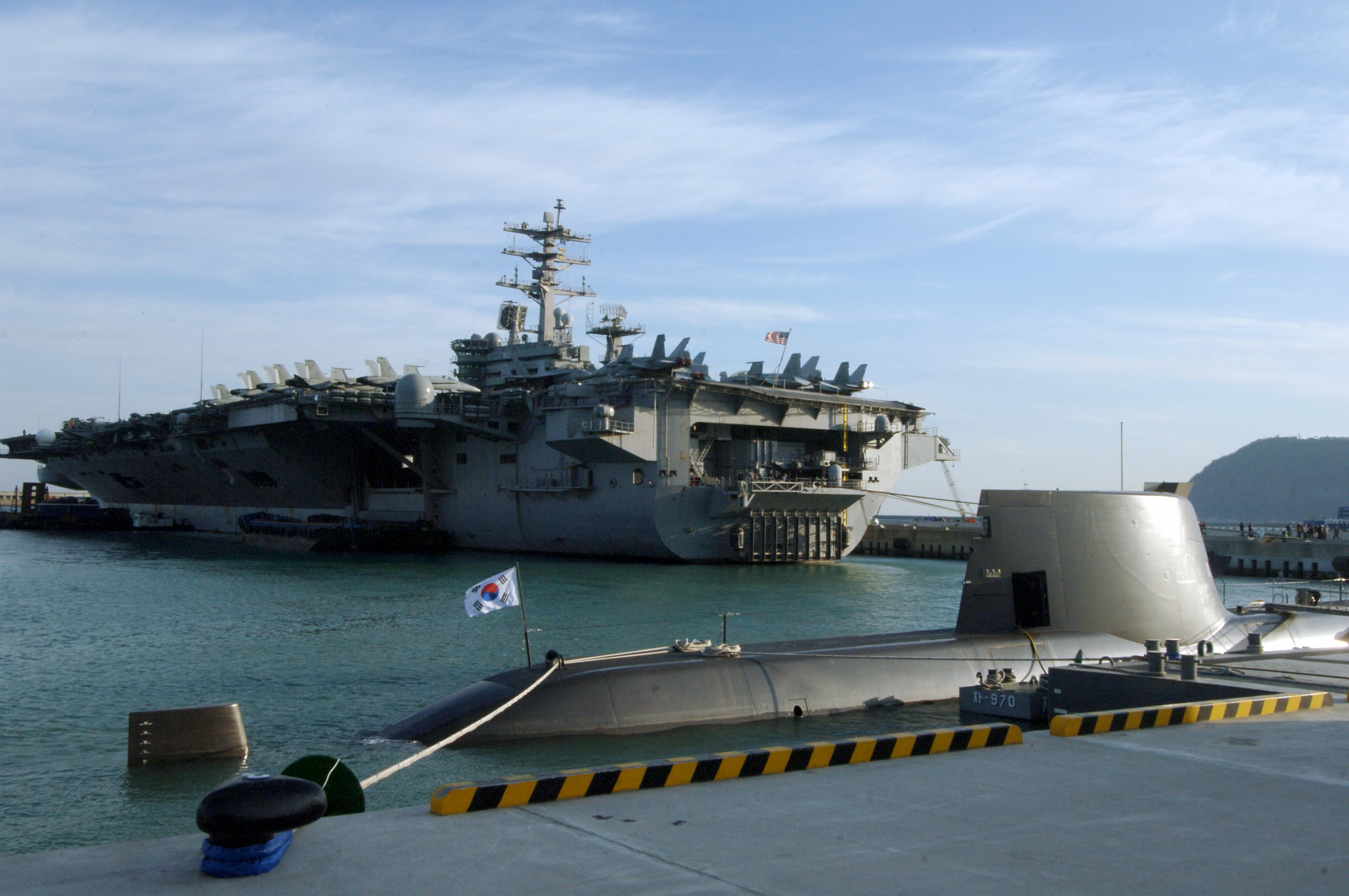
ROKS Sohn Won-yil and USS Nimitz on 28 February 2008
