= ROKS Jeong Ji =

Sohn Won-yil-class submarine

- Sohn Won-yil-class submarine

History

South Korea
- Name: Jeong Ji; (정지)
- Namesake: Jeong Ji
- Builder: Hyundai
- Laid down: 2004
- Launched: 13 June 2007
- Acquired: 28 November 2008
- Commissioned: 2 December 2008
- Identification: Pennant number: SS-073
- Status: Active

General characteristics
- Class & type: Sohn Won-yil-class submarine
- Displacement: 1,690 t (1,660 long tons) (surfaced); 1,860 t (1,830 long tons) (submerged)
- Length: 65 m (213 ft 3 in)
- Beam: 6.3 m (20 ft 8 in)
- Draught: 6 m (19 ft 8 in)
- Propulsion: Diesel-electric, fuel cell AIP, low noise skew back propeller
- Speed: 12 knots (22 km/h; 14 mph) surfaced; 20 knots (37 km/h; 23 mph) submerged
- Range: 12,000 nmi (22,000 km; 14,000 mi) (surfaced); 420 nmi (780 km; 480 mi) at 8 knots (15 km/h; 9.2 mph) (submerged); 1,248 nmi (2,311 km; 1,436 mi) at 4 knots (7.4 km/h; 4.6 mph) (submerged)
- Endurance: 84 days
- Test depth: nearly 400 m (1,300 ft)
- Complement: 5 officers + 22 crew
- Armament: 8 × 533 mm (21.0 in) torpedo tubes; 4 Sub-Harpoon missile-capable

ROKS Jeong Ji (SS-073) is the second boat of the Sohn Won-yil-class submarine in the Republic of Korea Navy. She is named after the general, Jeong Ji.

== Design ==
There are media reports that the Sohn Won-yil is equipped with eight 533 mm torpedo tubes, and that South Korea will mount a Korean Tomahawk missile, Hyunmoo-3, with a range of 500 km. It is said that they are also developing versions with a range of 1000 km and 1500 km, but there was no confirmation of whether this version could be mounted on a 533mm torpedo tube. Originally, the American Tomahawk missile was conceptually designed to be launched from a 533mm torpedo tube. Korea has also recently succeeded in localizing it.

The Cheonryong missile with a range of 500 km has been installed in the Sohn Won-yil-class and has been deployed and is in operation.

Germany, which exported the Sohn Won-yil-class (class 214), is using a Type 212 submarine that uses the same AIP system with the same displacement. It has a range of 20 km, and is equipped with four 533 mm torpedo tube, and is capable against air, surface, and submarine targets.

== Construction and career ==
ROKS Jeong Ji was launched on 13 June 2007 by Hyundai Heavy Industries and commissioned on 28 November 2008.

On 20 November 2019, the crew members of the submarine participated in the annual ancestral ritual, salute in front of the statue, and follow in the footsteps of Jeong Ji.
