= ROKS An Jung-geun =

Sohn Won-yil-class submarine

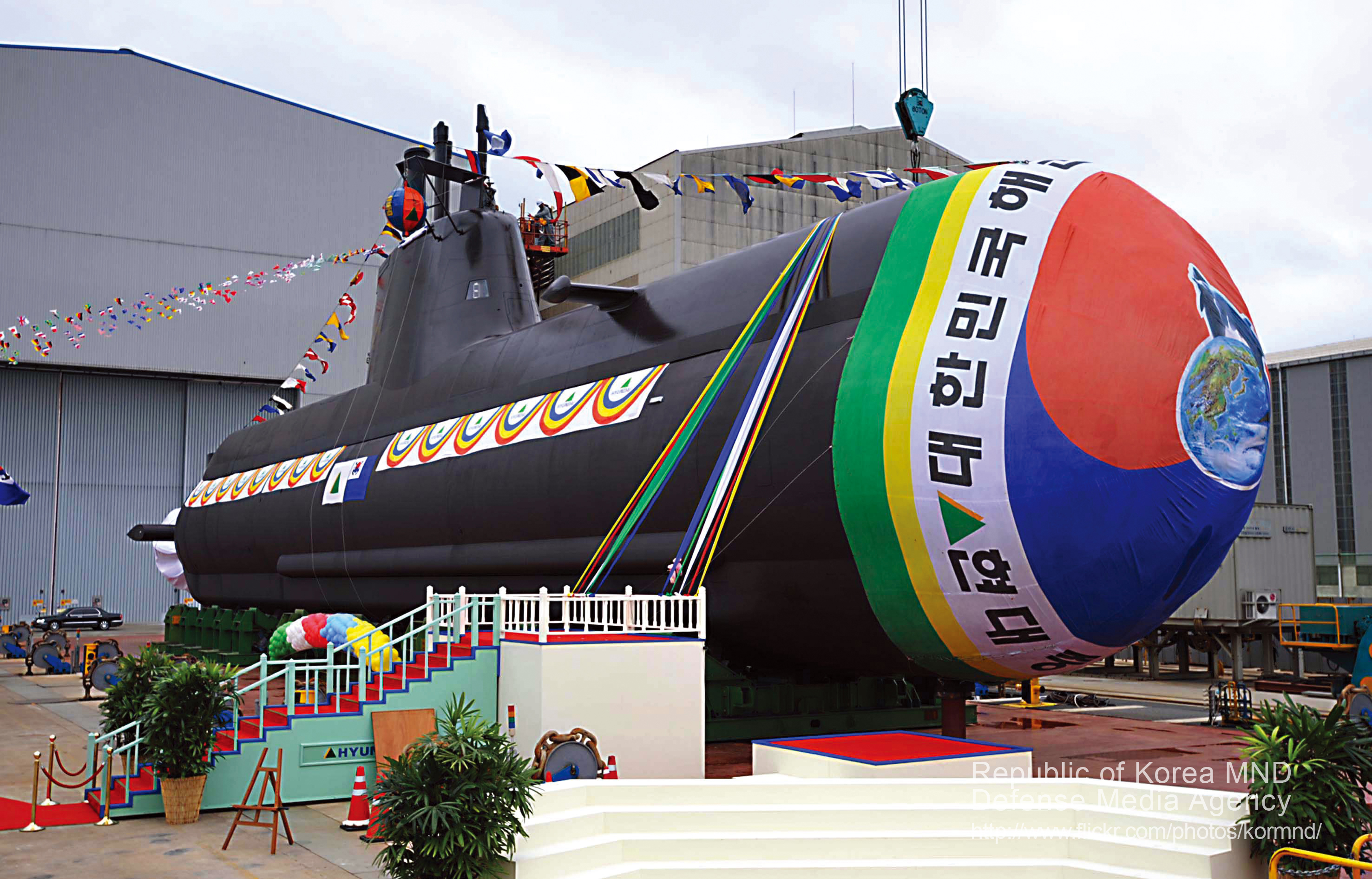
- ROKS An Jung-geun on 4 June 2008

History

South Korea
- Name: An Jung-geun; (안중근)
- Namesake: An Jung-geun
- Builder: Hyundai
- Laid down: 2005
- Launched: 4 June 2008
- Acquired: 30 November 2009
- Commissioned: 1 December 2009
- Identification: Pennant number: SS-075
- Status: Active

General characteristics
- Class & type: Sohn Won-yil-class submarine
- Displacement: 1,690 t (1,660 long tons) (surfaced); 1,860 t (1,830 long tons) (submerged)
- Length: 65 m (213 ft 3 in)
- Beam: 6.3 m (20 ft 8 in)
- Draught: 6 m (19 ft 8 in)
- Propulsion: Diesel-electric, fuel cell AIP, low noise skew back propeller
- Speed: 12 knots (22 km/h; 14 mph) surfaced; 20 knots (37 km/h; 23 mph) submerged
- Range: 12,000 nmi (22,000 km; 14,000 mi) (surfaced); 420 nmi (780 km; 480 mi) at 8 knots (15 km/h; 9.2 mph) (submerged); 1,248 nmi (2,311 km; 1,436 mi) at 4 knots (7.4 km/h; 4.6 mph) (submerged)
- Endurance: 84 days
- Test depth: nearly 400 m (1,300 ft)
- Complement: 5 officers + 22 crew
- Armament: 8 × 533 mm (21.0 in) torpedo tubes; 4 Sub-Harpoon missile-capable

ROKS An Jung-geun (SS-075) is the third boat of the Sohn Won-yil-class submarine in the Republic of Korea Navy. She is named after the Korean nationalist, An Jung-geun.

== Design ==
There are media reports that the Sohn Won-yil is equipped with eight 533 mm torpedo tubes, and that South Korea will mount a South Korean cruise missile, Hyunmoo-3, with a range of 500 km. It is said that they are also developing versions with a range of 1000 km and 1500 km, but there was no confirmation of whether this version could be mounted on a 533mm torpedo tube. Originally, the American Tomahawk missile was conceptually designed to be launched from a 533mm torpedo tube. South Korea has also recently succeeded in localizing it.

The Cheonryong missile with a range of 500 km has been installed in the Sohn Won-yil-class and has been deployed and is in operation.

Germany, which exported the Sohn Won-yil-class (class 214), is using a Type 212 submarine that uses the same AIP system with the same displacement. It has a range of 20 km, and is equipped with four 533 mm torpedo tube, and is capable against air, surface, and submarine targets.

== Construction and career ==
ROKS An Jung-geun was launched on 4 June 2008 by Hyundai Heavy Industries and commissioned on 1 December 2009.
