= Type 214 submarine =

Submarine class

- Type 214 profile

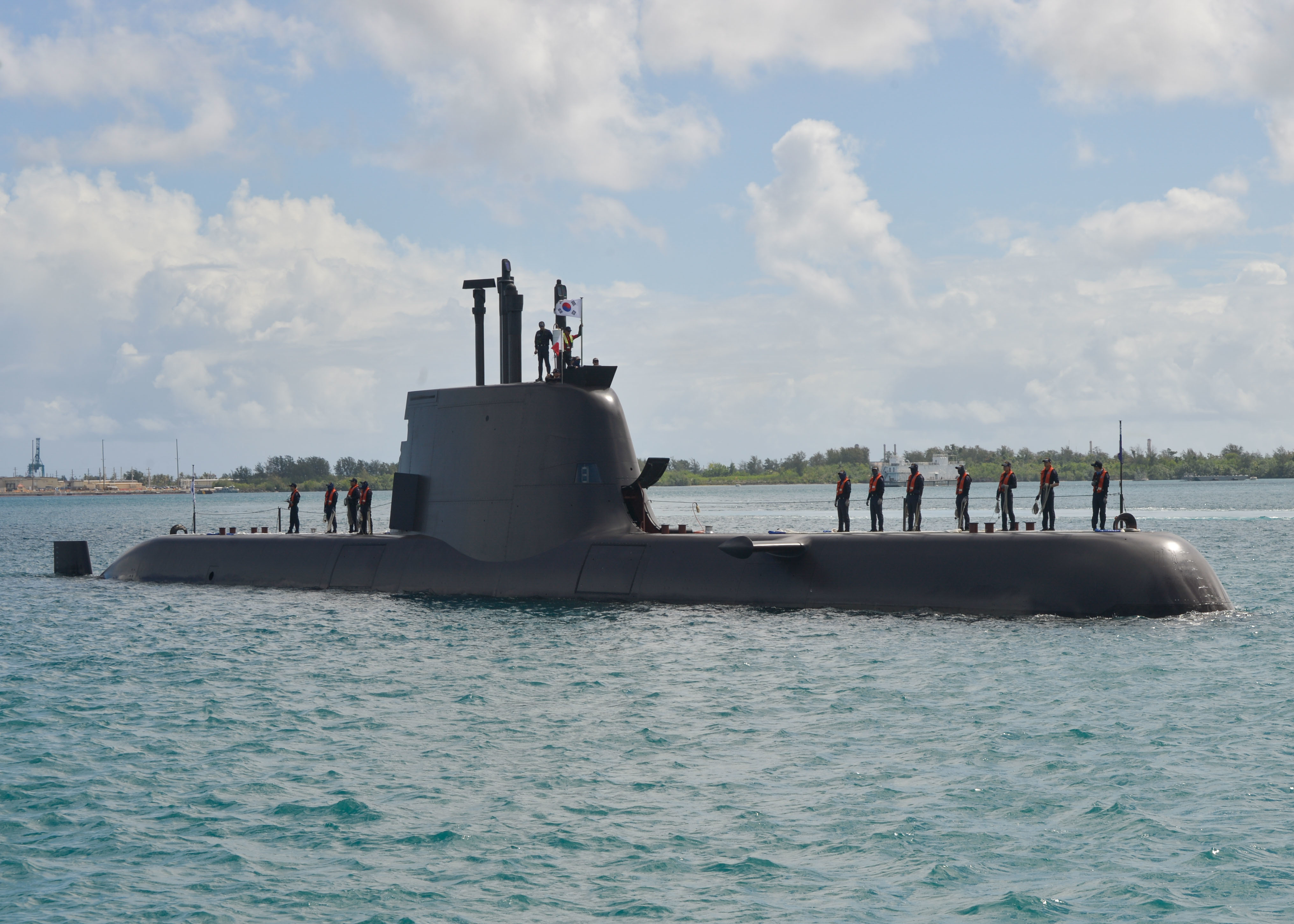
- ROKS Yun Bonggil arrives at Naval Base Guam, 2019.

Class overview
- Builders: Howaldtswerke-Deutsche Werft; Hellenic Shipyards Co.; Hyundai Heavy Industries; Daewoo Shipbuilding & Marine Engineering; Gölcük Naval Shipyard
- Operators: Hellenic Navy; Republic of Korea Navy; Portuguese Navy; Turkish Navy
- Preceded by: Jang Bogo-class submarine (Type 209 submarine)
- Succeeded by: Type 216 submarine
- Subclasses: Papanikolis class (Greece); Tridente class (Portugal); Reis class (Turkey)
- Cost: $330 million (2008)
- Built: 2001–present
- In commission: 2007–present
- Planned: 21
- Building: 4
- Completed: 17
- Active: 17

General characteristics
- Type: Submarine
- Displacement: 1,690 t (1,660 long tons) (surfaced); 1,860 t (1,830 long tons) (submerged)
- Length: 65 m (213 ft 3 in)
- Beam: 6.3 m (20 ft 8 in)
- Draught: 6 m (19 ft 8 in)
- Propulsion: Diesel–electric, fuel cell AIP, low-noise skew back propeller
- Speed: 12 knots (22 km/h; 14 mph) surfaced; 20 knots (37 km/h; 23 mph) submerged
- Range: 12,000 nmi (22,000 km; 14,000 mi) (surfaced); 420 nmi (780 km; 480 mi) at 8 knots (15 km/h; 9.2 mph) (submerged); 1,248 nmi (2,311 km; 1,436 mi) at 4 knots (7.4 km/h; 4.6 mph) (submerged)
- Endurance: 84 days
- Test depth: nearly 400 m (1,300 ft)
- Complement: 5 officers + 22 crew
- Armament: 8 × 533 mm (21.0 in) torpedo tubes; 4 Sub-Harpoon missile-capable

The Type 214 is a class of diesel–electric submarines developed exclusively for export by Howaldtswerke-Deutsche Werft GmbH (HDW). It features diesel propulsion with an air-independent propulsion (AIP) system using polymer electrolyte membrane (PEM) hydrogen fuel cells from Siemens Energy. The class combines the design principles of the Type 209 submarine family and the features of the Type 212A submarine. However, as an export design, it lacks some of the classified technologies of the Type 212 such as the non-magnetic steel hull that makes it difficult to detect using a magnetic anomaly detector.

Due to improvements in the pressure hull materials, the Type 214 can dive nearly 400 metres (1,300 ft). It can also carry food, fresh water and fuel for 84 days of operation.

A contract to build four submarines for the Hellenic Navy was signed 15 February 2000 and a fourth unit was ordered in June 2002. The first submarine was built at HDW in Kiel, Germany and the rest at the Hellenic Shipyards Co. in Skaramangas, Greece. The Hellenic Navy named them the Papanikolis class.

The Republic of Korea Navy has ordered nine Type 214 submarines, designated as Son Won-Il class, to be built in Korea by Hyundai Heavy Industries and Daewoo Shipbuilding & Marine Engineering; three first batch models entered service since 2007, and six second batch models entered service from 2012.

== General characteristics ==
- Displacement: 1,690 t surfaced / 1,860 t submerged
- Dimensions: length 65 m (213 feet 3 inches ) / beam 6,3 m (20 feet 8 inches) / draught 6 m (19 feet 8 inches)
- Pressure hull: HY-100
- Armament: 8 × 533 mm torpedo tubes, 4 subharpoon-capable
- Propulsion: low noise skew back propeller
- Diesel engines: 2 × MTU 16V-396 (3.96 MW)
- Charging generators: 2 × Piller Ntb56.40-10 0.97 MW
- AIP system: 2 × HDW PEM fuel cell module BZM120 (120 kW × 2)
- Electric motor: 1 × Siemens Permasyn (2.85 MW)
- Speed: 10 kn surfaced / 20 kn submerged
- Speed on fuel cells: 2–6 kn estimated
- Range surfaced: 19,300 km (12,000 miles)
- Range submerged: 780 km @ 15 km/h (420 nmi @ 8 kn)
- Range on fuel cells: 2,310 km @ 7 km/h (1,248 nmi @ 4 kn)
- Mission endurance: 12 weeks
- Submerged without snorkelling: 3 weeks
- Operating depth: more than 250 m (820 feet) officially, 400 m estimated (1312 feet)
- Complement: 5 officers + 22 crew
- Navigation radar: SPHINX-D with 4 kW pulse and tactical LPI radar sensor [Thales Deutschland Kiel]

== Operators ==
=== Current operators ===
==== Greece ====
The Hellenic Navy ordered four Type 214 submarines to be known as the Papanikolis class. The first, Papanikolis, was built in Germany; the following three were scheduled for construction at HDW's Hellenic Shipyards in Greece. In December 2006, StrategyPage reported that Papanikolis was found to have numerous technical problems. Among the reported problems with the submarine were excessive propeller cavitation, overheating of the air-independent propulsion system's fuel cells, and excessive rolling in bad weather when surfaced. Seapower magazine reported the Hellenic Navy refused to accept Papanikolis; additional problems noted were inadequate air-independent propulsion system output power, inappropriate periscope vibration, sonar flank array problems and seawater leakage into the ship's hydraulics.

The Hellenic Navy officers in charge of the testing program at the Kiel shipyards in Germany made their case clear in a 2007 investigative journalism program called "Neoi Fakeloi" on Skai TV (Greece). Retired Rear Admiral M. Simionakis, who had been in charge of the Papanikolis program for the navy, told the interviewer that the manufacturer had made two attempts to fix a severe balance problem in the submarine, including shifting 21 tons of material from the top to the bottom, yet the vessel continued to heel as much as 46 degrees in sea trials. Photographic evidence of the severe heeling was presented. In the same TV program, the officer replacing Simionakis in Kiel, Capt. K. Tziotis, listed seven ongoing, serious problems with the vessel, including balance problems when traveling on the surface, problems with the AIP system, problems with the weapon system, problems with the periscope, and problems with flooding.

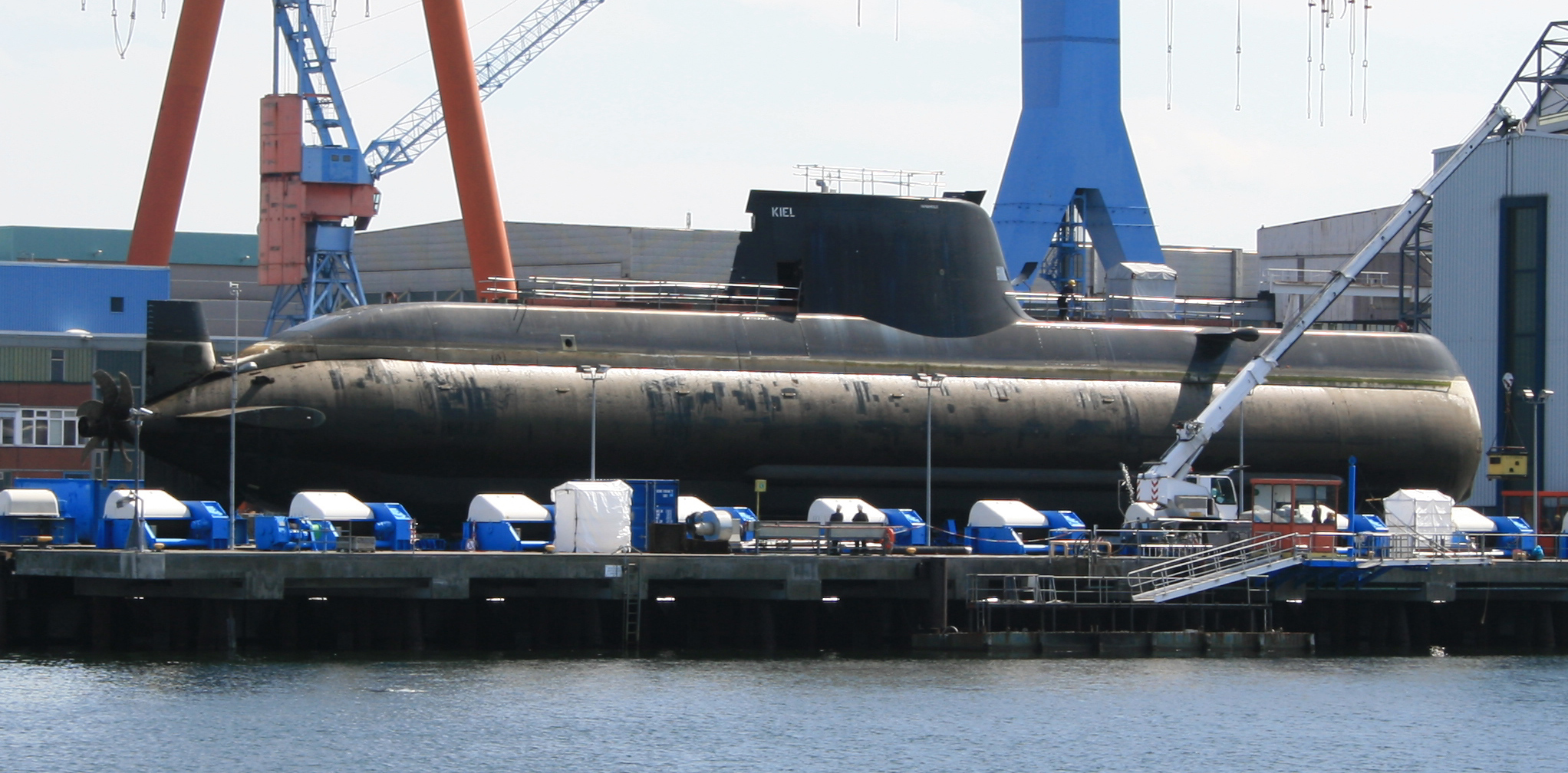
Greek submarine Papanikolis at the HDW's yard in Kiel, 2008

TKMS, the German shipbuilder of Type 214, had previously asserted that it solved all the boat's technical problems in 2006 and stated that the Greek Navy's continuing complaints about Papanikolis' technical condition are a ploy to justify a price reduction. Therefore, TKMS refused to deliver the boat to the Greek Navy until all debts were paid and Papanikolis remained in Kiel harbor. Despite this position by TKMS, the Hellenic Navy officers in charge of the submarine delivery have repeatedly stated there are problems with Papanikolis. In October 2008, Papanikolis conducted a new round of trials, which showed that the excessive rolling problem had finally been fixed. The rest of the problems are considered solved. According to the Greek defence press, acceptance of the vessel was imminent. The second boat, Pipinos, was officially launched on 6 October 2014 and passed through Greek harbour acceptance trials in Elefsina.

On 21 September 2009, TKMS announced that the contract with the Greek Navy for all four submarines had been cancelled due to country's arrears of more than 520 million Euros. TKMS began seeking arbitration to resolve the matter.

On 27 October 2009, the Greek Ministry of Defence confirmed that they intended to accept the three boats built in Greece.

The Greek Papanikolis U214 class is equipped with a hoistable radar mast which does not penetrate the pressure hull of the submarine. In the top of the radar mast the radar transmitter is installed. This transmitter is part of the SPHINX Radar System supplied by Thales Defence Deutschland GmbH in Kiel. The radar sensor is a FMCW transceiver which can't be detected by ESM systems in medium terms. This technology is so called LPI radar, which means "Low probability of intercept". The transmitting power is lower than the power of a mobile phone but the resolution more precise compared to high power Pulse radar. Thales SPHINX radar is a tactical radar, designed for submarines. Greece ordered four submarines and paid the list price of six. (2 bn euros)

On 29 April 2026 TKMS and Skaramangas Shipyards signed an exclusive partnership for a mid-life upgrade of the Hellenic Navy's four Type 214 (Papanikolis-class) submarines, with much of the work performed at Skaramangas.

==== Portugal ====
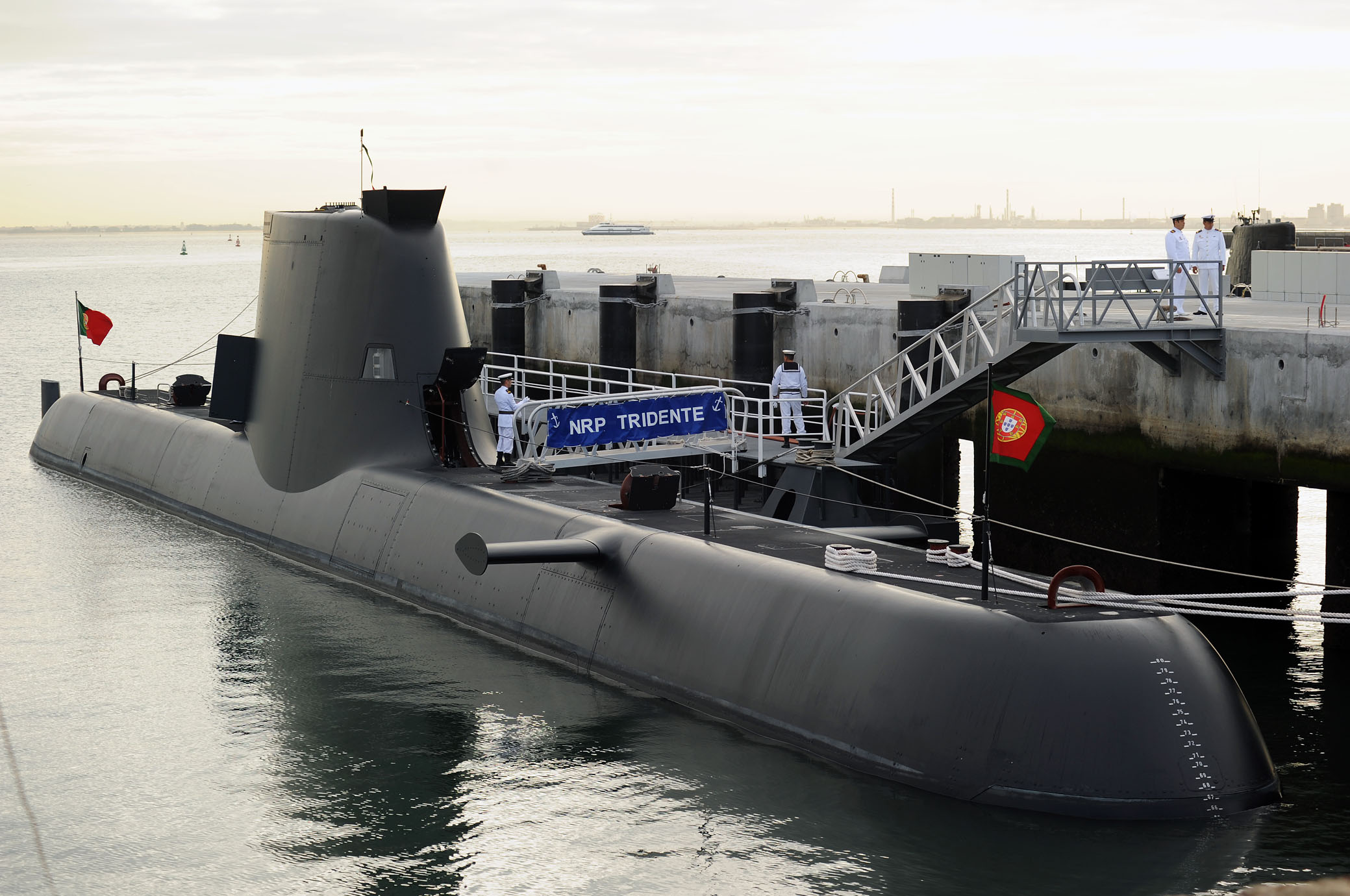
NRP Tridente at Lisbon Naval Base, 2010

In 2005 Portugal awarded a contract to Howaldtswerke-Deutsche Werft for two Type 214 submarines, which were delivered in 2010. These two submarines, the NRP Tridente and the NRP Arpão, are the only submarines currently in active service with the Portuguese Navy replacing the Albacora-class submarines in 2010. In 2014, the two submarines received new UGM-84G Sub-Harpoon Block II missiles. From 2016 to 2018 the Tridente submarine carried out a major mid-term overhaul at Thyssenkrupp Marine Systems shipyards, and the Arpão submarine, from 2018 to 2021 carried out a major mid-term overhaul at the Portuguese Arsenal do Alfeite shipyards The Portuguese Military Programming Law signed in May 2019 aims for the modernization of the two submarines by 2030.

==== South Korea ====
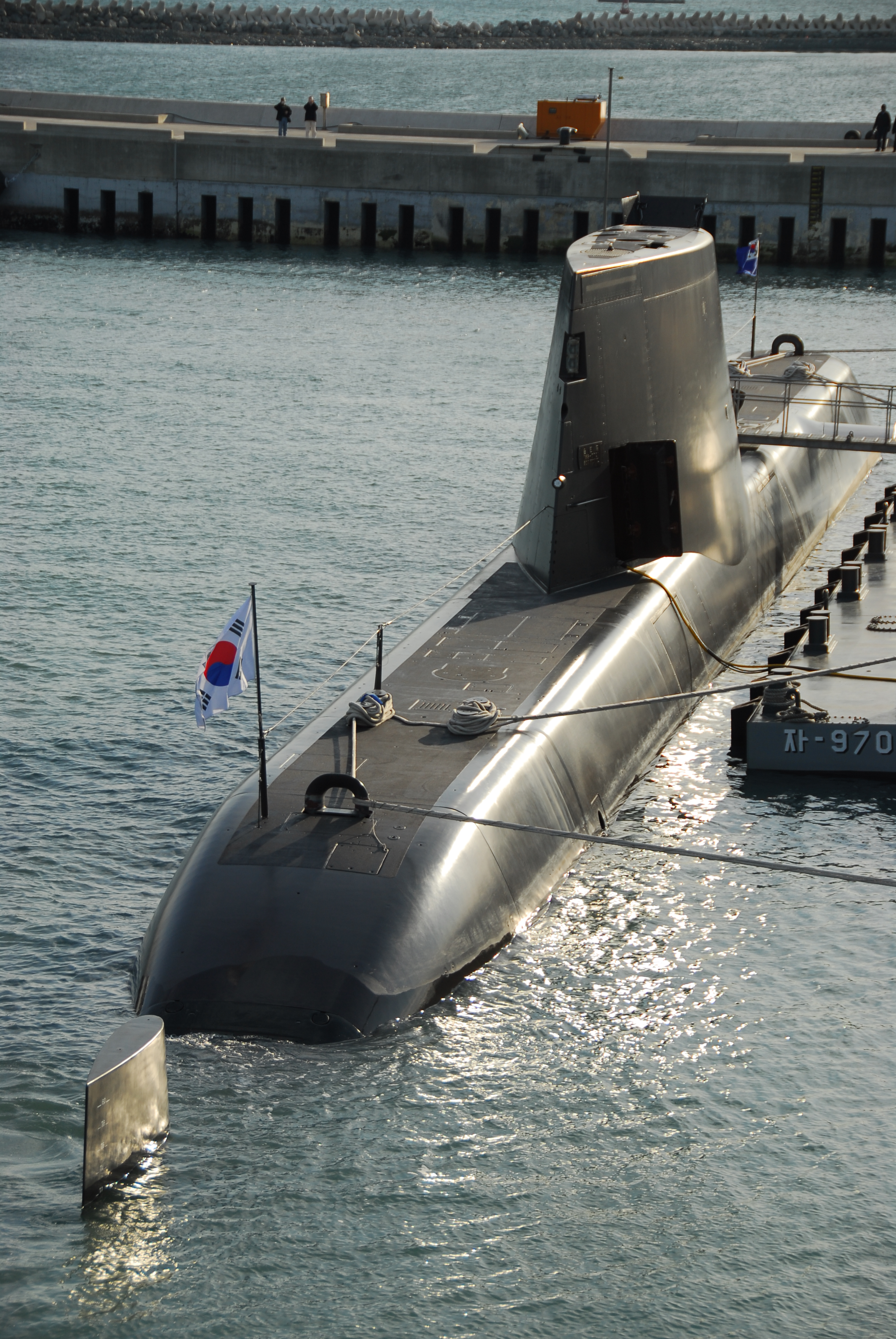
ROKS Son Won-il at Busan Naval Base, 2008

In 1995, the South Korean Navy announced plans to introduce submarines larger than type 209. Later in October 2000, the ministry of defence signed an agreement with Howaldtswerke-Deutsche Werft to introduce type 214 submarines, which also included the transfer of submarine building technology. The South Korean Son Won-Il U214-class submarine (Hangul: 손원일급 잠수함, Hanja: 孫元一級潛水艦) is equipped with a SPHINX-D Radar System supplied by Thales Defence Deutschland GmbH. It uses an additional pulse transmitter in the top of the mast. The combination of high power pulse radar and a very low power LPI transmitter is very effective for submarines. During surface operations, the boat sails with an open pulse fingerprint for ESM systems, but within a secret mission the operator switches to LPI mode. The boat remains invisible to others. Total of 9 are planned and 8 are in active duty. South Korea ordered its first three KSS-II/ Type 214 boats in 2000, which were assembled by Hyundai Heavy Industries. The Batch 2 order will add six more submarines to the Navy, to be built by Daewoo Shipbuilding & Marine Engineering.

In March 2008, it was reported in the media that the first Type 214 submarine of the Republic of Korea Navy suffered from defects related to excessive noise from the screw, according to anonymous sources. Later the ROKN denied the report. There were no further reports of such noise problems in succeeding South Korean Type 214 submarines. The first three Type 214 submarines of South Korea were built by Hyundai Heavy Industries. In August 2008, South Korea signed another contract with HDW for six more Type 214 submarines. The Batch 2 order will add six more submarines to the Navy, to be built by Daewoo Shipbuilding & Marine Engineering. Hong Beom-do, a specialized guided missile submarine was launched on 5 April 2016.

==== Turkey ====
The first request by the Turkish Naval Forces was made in 2009 and considered to be delivered in 2014. However, due to delay, a new contract was signed in 2016 and first deliveries were planned 2020. The Turkish Navy had commenced negotiations with HDW for six licence-built Type 214 class air-independent propulsion (AIP) submarines. According to the Undersecretary for Defence Industries of the Turkish Government, these submarines would be produced with maximum local content at Gölcük Naval Shipyard in Kocaeli, Turkey. The first submarine in the order initially put to sea in December 2022, the program partially delayed by the COVID-19 pandemic, with the second following in May 2023. As the Turkish Type 214 will have a significant amount of Turkish indigenous systems on board, this variant of the Type 214 will be known as the Type 214TN (Turkish Navy). HDW will preassemble classified elements such as the fuel cells and propulsion system and will then ship them to Turkey. All electronic and weapon systems (including the C4I system) will be of Turkish production.

On 2 July 2009, HDW and the Turkish Ministry of Defence entered into an agreement for the licensed production of six platforms. The agreement was the largest defence acquisition project in Turkey at the time after the firm order for 116 F-35 fighters at a cost of in excess of $10 billion. Ankara hoped that its advanced, locally produced and highly modified Type 214 submarines will enter into service by 2015. Defence Minister Vecdi Gonul stated that "Turkish industrial participation in the project would be worth around 80 percent of the total value of the deal".

On 1 July 2011, the 2 billion euros order for six U 214 submarine material packages placed with ThyssenKrupp Marine Systems by Turkey entered into force with receipt of the advance payment. This enabled ThyssenKrupp to begin executing the order. The order was designated to contribute to securing employment at HDW in Kiel, as well as at many subcontractors in Germany and Turkey, for the next ten years. Yet, recently Turkey has received around 2 Million euros compensation from ThyssenKrupp due to delayed manufacturing of the Type214TN. A possible reason for this delay is Turkey's demand for in-house developed software within the submarines. However, Germany refused Greek demands to block delivering six Type 214 submarines to Turkey, as the manufacturer Thyssen was bound by contracts signed since 2002.

As of 2025, two Reis-class submarines are fielded by the Turkish Navy.

=== Future operators ===
==== India ====
A larger variant of the Type 214 is being offered to India with the Project 75I, it is in competition against the S-80. It is possible though that the Type 212CD and the Type 218 are being offered as alternatives.

The French Barracuda-class and the Scorpène-class submarine were disqualified in 2021, and withdrawn in 2022. The South-Korean KSS-III submarine (DSME-3000) was also withdrawn. A Russian export Amur-class submarine (Amur-1650) was withdrawn in February 2022 after being disqualified in July 2021.

On 24 August 2025, the Indian government has officially cleared Germany's Type 214 submarine as the winning design for its Project 75I program.

== Failed bids ==
=== Indonesia ===
In the MEF III (Minimum Essential Force) it mentioned the Type 214 submarine from Germany alongside the Scorpène submarine from France. The Indonesian Navy is planning in procuring four to six superior Type 214 submarines and two Scorpene submarines.

On 2 March 2021, representatives of the German shipbuilder TKMS began discussions with the Indonesian Ministry of Defense and the Ministry of State Owned Enterprises regarding the procurement of up to four submarines of the Type 214 submarine.

On 2 April 2024, Indonesia only placed an order for two Scorpene submarines but not for the Type-214.

=== Pakistan ===
In 2008, the Pakistan Navy entered in negotiation of possibly purchasing three Type 214 to be built in KSEW through a technology transfer, and the HDW CEO Walter Freitag confirming and reportedly telling the news media in Pakistan during the IDEAS 2008 convention that: "The commercial contract has been finalised up to 95 per cent."

It was reported that the first Type 214 diesel–electric submarine would be delivered to the Pakistan Navy in 64 months after signing of the contract while the rest would be completed successively in 12 months. After wavering for over two years, Pakistan dropped out from this deal because of price concerns. They later went with eight Chinese Type 039A submarine that features the AIP technology to be built in Pakistan.

== Vessels by nation ==
Class	No.	Ship	Laid down	Launch Date	Comm.	Builder
Hellenic Navy (4 in service, 2 cancelled)
Papanikolis class	S-120	HS Papanikolis	27 Feb 2001	22 Apr 2004	2 Nov 2010	HDW
Papanikolis class	S-121	HS Pipinos	Feb 2003	Nov 2006	6 Oct 2014	Hellenic Shipyards Co.
Papanikolis class	S-122	HS Matrozos	Mar 2003	Feb 2014	23 Jun 2016	Hellenic Shipyards Co.
Papanikolis class	S-123	HS Katsonis	Mar 2004	Jun 2015	23 Jun 2016	Hellenic Shipyards Co.
Republic of Korea Navy (9 in service)
Sohn Wonyil class KSS-2	SS-072	ROKS Sohn Won-yil	Oct 2002	9 Jun 2006	27 Dec 2007	HHI
Sohn Wonyil class KSS-2	SS-073	ROKS Jeong Ji	2004	13 Jun 2007	2 Dec 2008	HHI
Sohn Wonyil class KSS-2	SS-075	ROKS An Jung-geun	2005	4 Jun 2008	1 Dec 2009	HHI
Sohn Wonyil class KSS-2	SS-076	ROKS Kim Jwa-jin	2008	13 Aug 2013	30 Dec 2014	DSME
Sohn Wonyil class KSS-2	SS-077	ROKS Yun Bong-gil	2009	3 Jul 2014	21 Jun 2016	HHI
Sohn Wonyil class KSS-2	SS-078	ROKS Yu Gwan-sun	2010	7 May 2015	10 Jul 2017	DSME
Sohn Wonyil class KSS-2	SS-079	ROKS Hong Beom-do	2011	5 Apr 2016	23 Jan 2018	HHI
Sohn Wonyil class KSS-2	SS-081	ROKS Lee Beom-seok	2012	8 Nov 2016	13 May 2019	DSME
Sohn Wonyil class KSS-2	SS-082	ROKS Shin Dol-seok	2013	7 Sep 2017	31 Jan 2020	HHI
Portuguese Navy (2 in service)
Tridente class U209PN	S-160	NRP Tridente	2005	2010	May 2010	HDW
Tridente class U209PN	S-161	NRP Arpão	2005	2010	28 Apr 2011	HDW
Turkish Naval Forces (2 in service, 4 to be delivered)
Reis class	S-330	TCG Piri Reis	28 Sep 2015	22 Dec 2019	25 Aug 2024	Gölcük Naval Shipyard
Reis class	S-331	TCG Hızır Reis	2016	23 May 2022	27 Nov 2025	Gölcük Naval Shipyard
Reis class	S-332	TCG Murat Reis	25 Feb 2018	8 Jun 2024	2026	Gölcük Naval Shipyard
Reis class	S-333	TCG Aydın Reis	4 Nov 2018		2027	Gölcük Naval Shipyard
Reis class	S-334	TCG Seydi Ali Reis	22 Dec 2019		2028	Gölcük Naval Shipyard
Reis class	S-335	TCG Selman Reis	23 May 2022		2029	Gölcük Naval Shipyard

Planned commissioning

== See also ==
- List of submarine classes in service

Submarines of similar comparison

- Type 212 submarine – A class of diesel–electric attack-submarines developed by ThyssenKrupp Marine Systems and exclusively built for the German Navy, the Italian Navy and the Royal Norwegian Navy.
- Type 218SG submarine – A class of extensively-customised diesel–electric attack-submarines developed by ThyssenKrupp Marine Systems and currently operated by the Republic of Singapore Navy.
- Dolphin-class submarine – A class of extensively-customised diesel–electric attack-submarines developed by ThyssenKrupp Marine Systems and currently operated by Israel.
- Dakar-class submarine – A unique class of diesel–electric attack-submarines developed by ThyssenKrupp Marine Systems and currently being built for Israel.
- Scorpène-class submarine – A class of export-oriented diesel–electric attack-submarines, jointly developed by Naval Group and Navantia and currently operated by the Chilean Navy, the Royal Malaysian Navy, the Indian Navy and the Brazilian Navy.
- S-80 Plus submarine – A class of conventionally-powered attack-submarines, currently being built by Navantia for the Spanish Navy.
- Blekinge-class submarine is a class of submarine developed by Kockums for the Swedish Navy
- KSS-III submarine – A class of diesel–electric attack and ballistic missile submarines, built by Hanwha Ocean and HD Hyundai Heavy Industries and operated by the Republic of Korea Navy.
- Sōryū-class submarine – A class of diesel–electric attack-submarines, built by Mitsubishi Heavy Industries for the Japan Maritime Self-Defense Force.
- Taigei-class submarine – A class of diesel–electric attack submarines currently being built by Mitsubishi Heavy Industries and Kawasaki Heavy Industries for the Japan Maritime Self-Defense Force
- Type 039A submarine – A class of diesel–electric attack-submarines operated by the People's Liberation Army Navy (China) and being built for the navies of the Royal Thai Navy and the Pakistan Navy.
- Lada-class submarine – A class of diesel–electric attack-submarines being built for Russia.
