= South Korea Ballistic Missile Range Guidelines =

1979 U.S.–South Korea agreement

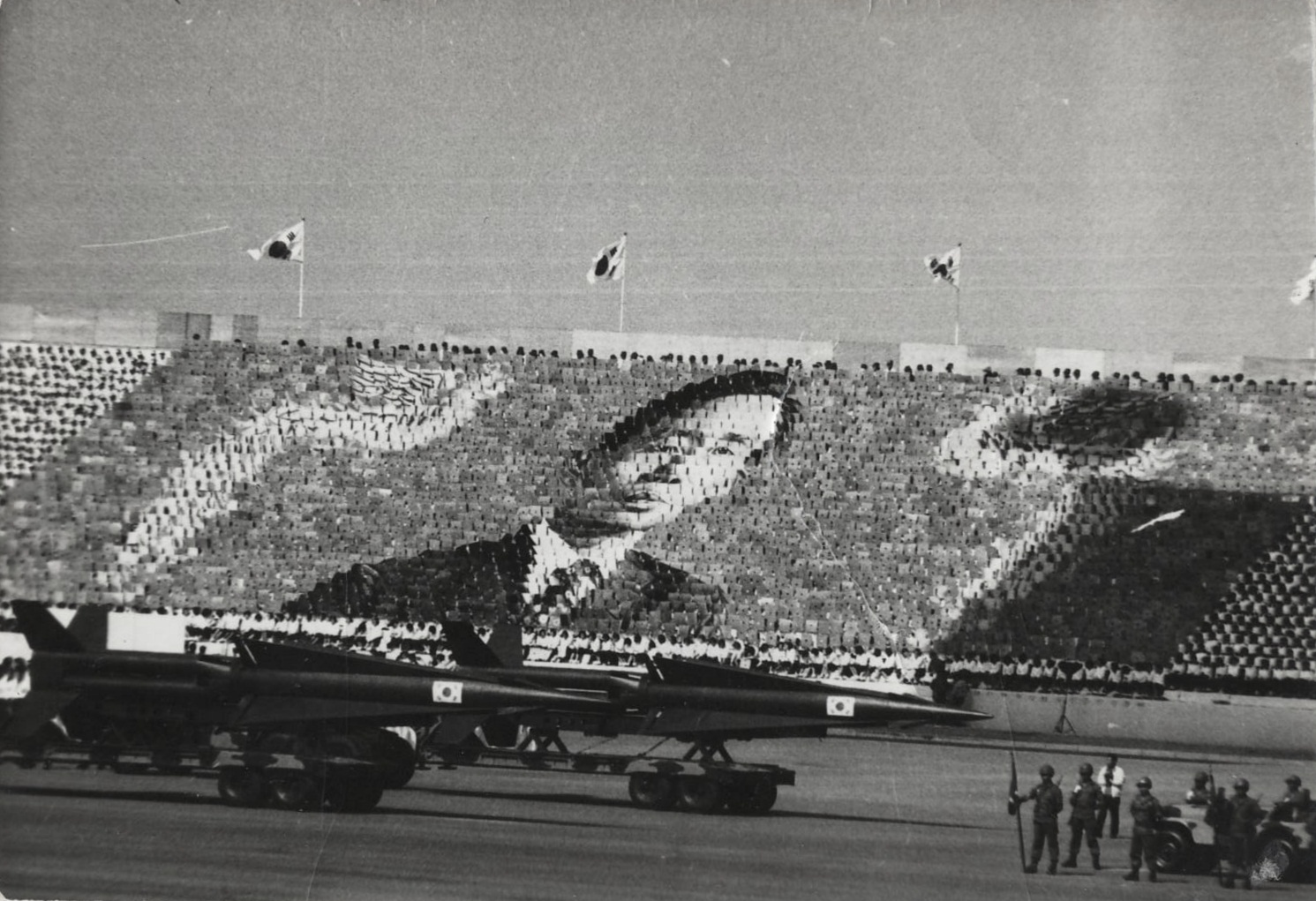
South Korean Hyunmoo-1 (modified based on Nike Hercules) missiles, with a range of about 140 km, on display in 1973

The guidelines were an agreement between South Korea and the United States, operating from 1979 to 2021, aiming to reduce missile proliferation in the region. It limited the range of South Korean weapons, so that nearby countries other than North Korea, particularly Japan, would not feel threatened by them, limiting their desire to build similar weapons.

== History ==
In 1979, South Korea agreed to ballistic missile guidelines, limiting the country's ballistic missile development and possession to 180 km in range. The United States at the same time made available short range missile technology, including the Nike Hercules which helped South Korea develop the NHK-1 ballistic missile.

In 2001, United States officials agreed to extend the range limit to 300 km, which only applied to high-velocity, free flight ballistic missiles, excluding slower, surface-skimming cruise weapons. South Korea developed an unmanned aerial vehicle (UAV) and cruise missile called Hyunmoo-3. The UAV would not have any limitation in range while the cruise missile's range was 1500 kilometers (930 miles). South Korea's missile ranges were less than North Korea's missiles such as Rodong-1 (1300 kilometer-ranged ballistic missile) and Taepodong-2 (6000 kilometer-ranged intercontinental ballistic missile).

On October 6, 2012, after numerous caucuses between South Korea and the U.S., both agreed to extend the ballistic missile range to 800 km. This was shorter than the range South Korea suggested (1000 kilometers) but much longer than the existing 300 km limit.

After the latest missile guideline extension, one particular Chinese media reported that South Korea's ballistic missiles would gain the capability to reach China, Japan, and Russia as well as North Korea. The media showed concerns over the possibility of a South Korean attack on Beijing, should the South's missile range be extended. Another Chinese media outlet, Xinhua, evaluated that the extension of the missile range as a violation against the Missile Technology Control Regime (MTCR). Japan raised concerns of heightened resistance by North Korea. The Russian Department of External Affairs opposed the extension of South Korea's missile range, through the column of Alexander Lukashcvich, spokesperson of Department of External Affairs. North Korea stated that they would strengthen their military force in response to the extension. North Korea stated that their rockets were capable of reaching South Korea, Japan, Guam, and even the US. North Korea also said they would 'respond to nuclear weapons with nuclear weapons, and respond to missiles with missiles' as stated by the National Defense Committee. The National Defense Committee also stated the only thing left was resolute action and that they would show the world an 'unimaginable war'. Jay Carney, the spokesperson of the White House, briefed that the agreement for extending the missile range was to improve South Korea's defense capacity to face the threats of North Korea's ballistic missiles. He also emphasized that the alliance between the U.S. and South Korea focused on the mission to keep the Korean peninsula, and Southeast Asia safe, and the U.S. would keep to their pledge of defending South Korea steadily.

In 2017 South Korea tested an 800 km range Hyunmoo-2C missile.

On 4 September 2017, U.S. President Donald Trump agreed "in principle" to scrap a warhead weight limit on South Korea's missiles in the wake of North Korea's sixth nuclear test.

On May 21, 2021, South Korean President Moon Jae-in and U.S. President Joe Biden agreed to completely abolish missile guidelines, allowing South Korea to develop and possess any type of missile, including intercontinental ballistic missiles (ICBMs) and advanced submarine-launched ballistic missiles (SLBMs).

== Summary chart ==
South Korea Ballistic Missile Range Limits
Year	Range	Payload	Use of solid-fuel
1979-2001	180 km	500 kg	All
2001-2012	300 km	500 kg	All
2012-2017	800 km	500 kg	All
2017-2020	800 km	Unlimited	All
2020-2021	800 km	Unlimited	Military
2021-present	Abolished		

== See also ==
- Ballistic Missile
- Cruise Missile
- Unmanned Aerial Vehicle
- List of North Korean missile tests
