= KM1500 =

South Korean military transport vehicle

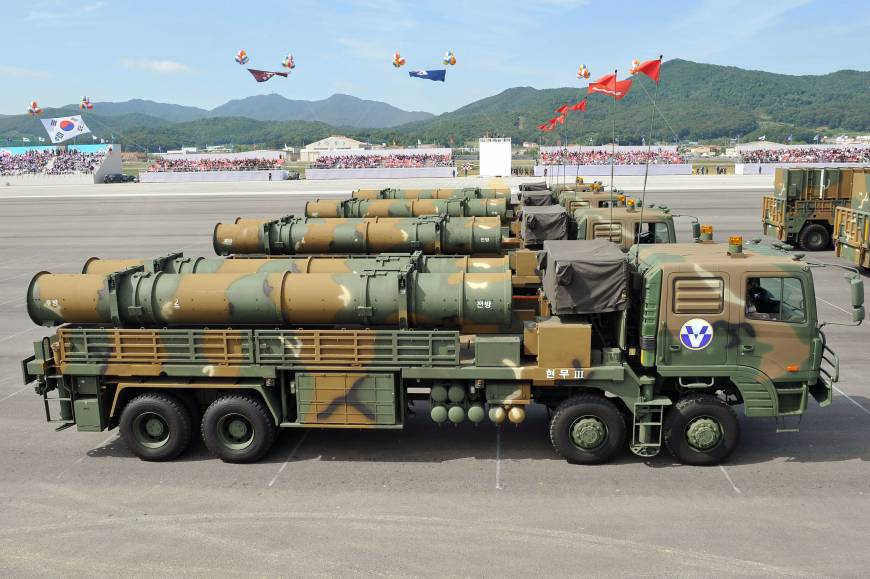
KM1500 carrying Hyunmoo-3 cruise missiles

KM1500 is a family of heavy off-road capable 8x8 military transport vehicles manufactured by Kia Motors for the South Korean Armed Forces. Versions of this vehicle carry KM-SAM and Hyunmoo-3 missiles. The M1502 tank transporter can carry the K1 88-Tank.

The vehicle weighs 32 t and is 11 m long, 3 m wide and 3.6 m high. It is designed to withstand harsh environmental conditions such as exposure to electromagnetic waves and cryogenic or hot conditions. It has a 60% slope / 20% transverse slip capability and is capable of crossing a river with a depth of 76 cm. An 8X8 front wheel drive, 16 stage AMT, full air braking device and ABS are installed. The vehicle is powered by a modified Powertech commercial diesel engine with a rating of 450 horsepower and 190 kg/m, providing a top speed of 90 km/h and a cruising range of 700 km.
