= Hyunmoo-3 =

South Korean cruise missile

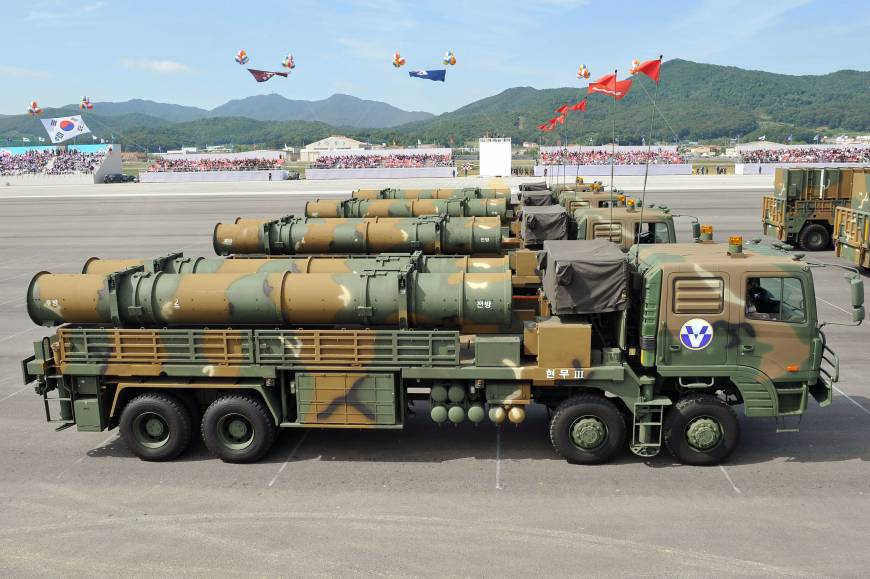
- Hyunmoo-3 missiles on KM1500 transporter erector launchers
- Type: Long-range, all-weather cruise missile Land-attack missile Surface-to-surface missile Submarine-launched cruise missile
- Place of origin: South Korea

Service history
- In service: 2006–present (3A); 2009–present (3B); 2012–present (3C)
- Used by: Republic of Korea Army; Republic of Korea Navy

Production history
- Designer: Agency for Defense Development; LIG Nex1
- Manufacturer: LIG Defense & Aerospace
- Variants: Hyunmoo-3A; Hyunmoo-3B; Hyunmoo-3C; Hyunmoo-3D

Specifications
- Mass: 1.5 metric tons (3,300 lb) (3A)
- Length: 19 feet (5.8 m) (3A)
- Diameter: 0.53-0.60 meters (2.0 ft)
- Warhead: Conventional: 500 kilograms (1,100 lb) conventional explosive
- Engine: Samsung Hanwha Techwin (or Daewoo Doosan) (SSM-760K ?) turbofan
- Operational range: Hyunmoo-3A - 500 kilometers (310 mi); Hyunmoo-3B - 1,000 kilometers (620 mi); Hyunmoo-3C - 1,500 kilometers (930 mi); Hyunmoo-3D - 3,000 kilometers (1,900 mi)
- Maximum speed: Hyunmoo-3A,-3B, -3C: subsonic Hyunmoo-3D: Mach 1.2
- Guidance system: INS, GPS, Terrain Contour Matching

The Hyunmoo-3 is a family of cruise missiles fielded by the South Korean military designed by Agency for Defense Development (ADD). The name Hyunmoo (Korean: 현무) comes from the mythical Black Tortoise (Chinese: 玄武) described as the "Guardian of the Northern Sky", perhaps hinting North Korea.

== Design and development ==
As a signatory of the multilateral Missile Technology Control Regime, South Korea agrees to refrain from importing a non-indigenous ballistic missile with a warhead larger than 500 kilograms (1,100 lb), or a range of more than 300 kilometers (190 mi). Historically a bilateral agreement between the ROK and US additionally limited indigenous South Korean produced ballistic missiles in both range and warhead size. Therefore, heavy emphasis was put on developing long-range cruise missiles by the South Korean government. With the introduction of Hyunmoo-3, the Republic of Korea Army created the Missile Command in order to efficiently manage these missiles.

Despite the name, the Hyunmoo-3 bears no resemblance to the previous Hyunmoo SSM, which were improved versions of Nike Hercules surface-to-air missiles that were converted into short-range high-speed surface-to-surface ballistic missiles in response to North Korea's Scud-B and Nodong-1 missile threats. Instead, the new missile's designs are strikingly similar to the United States Tomahawk cruise missile. It is powered by a turbofan engine, and has a maximum payload of 500 kilograms (1,100 lb) of conventional explosive. The guidance systems consist of inertial guidance system and global positioning system.

== Variants ==
Hyunmoo-3A, which was nicknamed "Eagle-1" (독수리-1) during the testing, has a range of 500 km, while Hyunmoo-3B, nicknamed "Eagle-2" (독수리-2) Cheonryong (천룡 순항 미사일), has a range of 1,000 kilometers (620 mi). Hyunmoo-3C, or "Eagle-3" (독수리-3), will be capable of striking its target up to 1,500 kilometers (930 mi) away. This is a significant improvement from Hyunmoo I which had a range of 180 kilometers (110 mi) and Hyunmoo-2A, which only has a range of 300 kilometers (190 mi), both of which were ballistic and not cruise missiles.

Sejong the Great-class destroyers and KSS-III-class submarines will be equipped with these Chonryong submarine-launched cruise missiles inside their K-VLS cells.

A Hyunmoo-3B air-launched cruise missile with over 500 km (310 mi) range exists and it is called Boramae.

A submarine-launched cruise missile called the Haeseong III is designed to be launched underwater from submarines. It is actually the designation for the Hyunmoo-3 cruise missile when launched from a submarine and is unrelated to the SSM-700K Haeseong missile design.

== Operators ==
- South Korea
  - Chungmugong Yi Sun-sin-class destroyer (KDX-II)
  - Sejong the Great-class destroyer (KDX-III)
  - Son Won-il-class submarine (KSS-II)
