= Defense industry of South Korea =

The defense industry of South Korea is the main supplier of armaments to the Republic of Korea's Armed Forces. Originally heavily reliant on the United States to supply weapons to its armed forces, South Korea began manufacturing its own weapons through the country's industrialization and military modernization efforts. Today, South Korea enjoys a robust defense industry and is the world's 8th largest weapons exporter.

== History ==
=== Background ===
Following South Korea's liberation from Japan on 15 August 1945, the Republic of Korea established its first independent government along with its own armed forces on 15 August 1948. However, the ROK's military was unprepared and ill-equipped to fight due to their lack of personnel, training, and heavy weapons. In contrast, North Korea had significantly more personnel and benefited from the Chinese and Soviets in the form of rigorous training, manpower, military organization, and the supply of various weapons. This would prove devastating at the beginning of the Korean War, as the ROK military was pushed to the brink of defeat until the US-led UN coalition intervened in the war. South Korea's experience during the war emphasized the country's dependence on the United States for its defense. A drive for the ROK military to be better equipped and trained gradually emerged, but economic underdevelopment and instability prevented the country from developing its own defense industry, forcing reliance on the US until the late 1960s.

=== Under the Third and Fourth Republic of Korea ===
In 1969, President Richard Nixon announced that the United States would begin to reduce its military presence in Asia and allow its Asian allies to be in charge of their own security. The result of decreasing American commitment, combined with fresh memories of North Korean military provocations, forced South Korea to become self-reliant.

The 1970s would mark the beginning of South Korea's defense industry. Authoritarian president Park Chung Hee implemented military reforms to modernize the military and kick-start South Korea's domestic defense industry. Concurrently, President Park implemented reforms and policies to industrialize South Korea, paving the way for massive economic growth. Based on the Second Republic's (planned) five-year economic plan, President Park would initiate his own five-year plans, normalize relations with Japan in 1965, and maintain close ties with the US to receive the much-needed economic aid to accomplish his goals. By the Third Five-Year Plan (1972–1976), South Korea would commit to investing and developing its own heavy and chemical industries to achieve independent defense industrialization. This resulted, as early as 1973, in the enactment of the Heavy and Chemical Industry (HCI) Development Plan. This economic plan aimed to switch South Korea's production from light manufacturing to heavy and chemical industries, focusing on shipbuilding, steel, heavy machinery, non-ferrous metals, electronics, and chemical/petrochemicals. The HCI plan was partially motivated by "self-defense against North Korea." (The U.S. withdrew some troops from South Korea in 1971 amid tension over human rights.) Several key military reforms during that time included the Agency for Defense Development (ADD) in 1970, the Special Law on Military Procurement, and the Yulgok Plan in 1974.

The ADD primarily helped South Korean defense industrialists streamline research and development, acquire foreign military technologies, and directly engage in product development. The first weapon that South Korea would produce on its own (albeit with restrictions) were licensed Colt M16 rifles in 1971. Other US-designed weapons and ammunition would later be produced under license in the mid-1970s. Between 1977 and 1984, defense contractors would also begin to reverse engineer US-made weapons to help research and develop their own domestic weapons. The Special Law on Military Procurement encouraged private firms to participate in the defense industry by providing incentives. These incentives included government financing, preferential financial agreements, reduced taxes and tariffs, concession of plant sites, administrative support, exemption of military drafting for skilled employees, and government guarantees of corporate survival and rescue for companies that showed signs of financial struggle. The National Investment Fund was established to provide financial resources to the nation's growing heavy and chemical industries. It later evolved into the Defense Industrial Promotion Fund in 1980 (until its dissolution in 2006) to allocate resources directly to the defense industry. The Yulgok Plan was launched to implement South Korea's military modernization and build up combat capabilities independently of the US. To accomplish these goals, indigenous arms production was prioritized by encouraging local production and procurement for the military.

President Park's intermingling of economic and defense policy was very successful, as the South Korean military and defense industry greatly benefited from the country's rapid economic growth and industrialization. By the time of the Fourth Five-Year Plan (1977–1981), South Korea's defense industry relied on a diversified base of suppliers, such as heavy industries, electronics, and shipbuilding. The country's shipbuilding industry in particular experienced rapid success as South Korea indigenously developed the Chamsuri-class patrol boat, which entered service in 1979.

However, the defense industry was not devoid of issues. As the country was under a military dictatorship at the time, policies and decision-making related to the defense industry were highly centralized under President Park and his technocrats in the Blue House, especially O Wonchol. As a result, decisions that were made were implemented quickly without public input or participation, including those involved in the defense industry. The consequences of having those decisions made in the absence of effective planning and coordination included inefficiency, redundancy, and oversaturation in the defense industry. The market became overcrowded with manufacturers competing with each other to manufacture every type of component in order to acquire a larger share of the arms market, preventing the South Korean defense industry from reaping the benefits of "higher quality and economies of scale that come from specialization."

=== Under the Fifth Republic of Korea ===
Following the assassination of Park Chung-hee in 1979, South Korea experienced economic difficulties as well as political and social turmoil, lasting through the transition from the Fourth Republic to the Fifth. In the late 1970s, internal economic problems emerged from South Korea's rapid development due to the over-emphasis on heavy and chemical industries. Under Park Chung Hee's administration, heavy and chemical industries were overemphasized in the drive to develop a home-grown defense industry and modernize the military. The lack of proper investment and planning led to wasteful spending, and the economy began to experience an alarming increase in inflation rate. Combined with the 1979 oil crisis, an underdeveloped agriculture sector, and growing foreign debt, reckless investment in the defense industry contributed to the economic crisis between the late-1970s and mid-1980s.

As a result of the economic, political, and social crisis gripping South Korea in the early 1980s, President Chun Doo-hwan implemented reforms and changes to stabilize the country again. The Fifth Five-Year Plan (1982–1986) shifted the government's focus away from heavy and chemical industries. Decisions and responsibilities related to the defense industry and weapons development now fell under the purview of the Ministry of National Defense (MND) and the Ministry of Trade and Industry instead of the President. President Chun would also establish the Korean Institute for Defense Analysis (modeled after the US Institute for Defense Analyses) in 1979 as a means to further plan and coordinate the defense industry with the government through the MND.

The 1980s would see a relative decline (in absolute terms) in the defense industry's output combined with better efficiency overall. By the 1980s, the defense industry had matured enough to produce basic weapons and equipment, accomplishing the country's goal of its military becoming self-sustaining. However, as a result of accomplishing this raison d'être, the development of the defense industry itself became static. Furthermore, the market size and demands for military products decreased since South Korea achieved its conventional weapons needs without compensating with massive increases in military spending. The lack of new investment, profit, and growth discouraged manufacturers from investing in the defense industry, even with the government's promise of financial assistance. Soon, military production began to decrease, with some defense contractors even going bankrupt from this stagnation. Arms exports in particular were acutely affected, with $975 million in revenue in 1982 dropping to a mere $50 million in 1988.

Despite this, the shipbuilding sector would continue to produce indigenous warships throughout the 1980s: the Ulsan-class frigate, Donghae-class corvette, and Ganggyeong (Swallow)-class minehunter based on the Italian Lerici-class minehunter.

=== Late 1980s- Early 2020s ===
Between the late 1980s and early 1990s, South Korea and its defense industry, under different administrations, experienced drastic changes due to both domestic and international events. In 1987, the country's political system transitioned from a military dictatorship to a democratic government. The early 1990s would also see Germany reunified, the collapse of the Soviet Union, and the subsequent end of the Cold War. As the threat of the Soviet military ended, the US began another phase of reducing its military presence in East Asia. In response, newly elected President Roh Tae-woo would implement new rounds of military reforms called the "August 18 Plan" or "818 Plan" on 18 August 1988. The plan aimed to further reduce South Korea's military dependence on the United States by further increasing self-reliance—"Koreanization of Korean defense", as Roh puts it. The defense industry would find itself reinvigorated as part of the 818 Plan, which includes restructuring the military and procuring new weapons. The plan desired the military to possess a balanced mix of highly advanced (albeit expensive) weapons and moderately priced conventional weapons. In addition, the air force and navy would increase and strengthen their assets to fill the gap the US military would leave behind.

In the late 1980s, South Korean Navy began pursuing the acquisition of larger submarines to supersede their 150-ton Dolgorae midget submarines to better protect critical shipping lanes from North Korean submarines. The Jang Bogo-class submarine was later developed in the 1990s based on the German Type 209 submarine. In 1989, South Korea's aerospace industry became more proactive in the defense business. Seoul announced that it would develop the Korean Fighters Program with McDonnell Douglas (now merged with Boeing) to help domestically develop a supersonic fighter jet within two decades of the announcement. South Korea would select the McDonnell Douglas F/A-18 Hornet to be co-produced, with Samsung Aerospace contracted to manufacture the engine and airframe while LG Corporation was subcontracted to manufacture the avionics. The deal, however, fell through, and the F-16 was later selected and built. Korean Air would also be contracted by the U.S. Air Force to handle maintenance of their fleet of F-4, F-15, A-10, and C-130 stationed in South Korea, Japan, and the Philippines.

In 1990, South Korea would produce new tanks, artillery, and helicopters for its military. The K1 88-Tank would be developed by Hyundai Precision based on the XM1 tank (M1 Abrams prototype) as a successor to the country's inventory of the M48 Patton. Samsung Techwin produced a licensed-built American M109 howitzer dubbed the K55. KIA Machine Tool manufactured the 105 mm KH-178 and 155 mm KH-179 towed howitzers. UH-60 helicopters would also be manufactured in South Korea by Samsung Aerospace. Around this time, South Korea's defense industry was able to produce 70% of the country's military weapons, vehicles, equipment, and ammunition.

These efforts would be somewhat hampered by the election of President Kim Young-sam. To further do away with the military's influence on South Korea's politics, President Kim started to place the military under civilian control and remove elements of authoritarianism in the military. These efforts included the dissolution of Hanahoe and the arrest of former presidents Chun Doo-hwan and Roh Tae-woo. As the military no longer held the major influence it once did, innovation and changes for the military and defense industry became less of a priority.

South Korea's military advancements would resume under President Kim Dae-jung. On 15 April 1998, President Kim would establish the Committee for the Promotion of Defense Reform and the Five-Year Defense Reform Plan. The Committee concluded that South Korea was in need of a more information-based and cutting-edge military, along with restructuring to make it more effective and economical. Under this advice, Kim's government would begin to promote the development and procurement of more advanced weapons and assets across all branches of the military.

On 1 June 2005, President Roh Moo-hyun's administration drafted the Defense Reform 2020 to further establish a more technologically advanced military and sophisticated defense capability for the country. Part of the reform involved reducing the size of the armed forces from 650,000 to 500,000 by 2020, counterbalanced by the procurement of new assets to improve, develop, and/or expand its operations. As such, the South Korean defense industry would experience a very large surge in development and manufacturing. For example, since the army would be the most affected branch in terms of downsizing, new UAVs, tanks, artillery, infantry fighting vehicles, and other weapons would be developed. The South Korean navy would aim to become a blue-water navy, meaning corresponding investments in naval procurement. Likewise, the air force upgraded its own capabilities by acquiring its own "high-low mix" of fighters (i.e., F-15K), attack helicopters, surface-to-air missiles, aerial refueling, and airborne early warning and control aircraft. On 1 January 2006, the Defense Acquisition Program Administration (DAPA) was established to further enhance the administration of military projects and procurement.

In the 2010s, amidst rising Chinese militarization, a resurgence of Russian bellicose activity, and the growing uncertainty of American security assurances, countries from Southeast Asia and Europe began to strengthen and upsize their militaries. As a result, South Korea's defense industry would see a large surge of new customers and increased exports throughout the 2010s. South Korea would also implement reforms to increase the defense industry's competitiveness. The massive increase in manufacturing and exports resulted in unprecedented growth for South Korea's defense industry and military. Arms export revenue would rise to $3.2 billion in 2017, compared to $250 million in 2006. In 2018, South Korea became the 11th largest arms exporter in the world, according to the Stockholm International Peace Research Institute (SIPRI). South Korea's arms exports from 2009–2013 and 2014–2018 increased by 94%. Additionally, South Korea's military expenditure from 2009 to 2018 increased by 28 percent.

In July 2018, President Moon Jae-in introduced the Defense Reform 2.0, an improved version of the Defense Reform 2020 created in 2005. Part of the new reform placed great emphasis on supporting South Korea's defense industry and export capabilities, not only to grow the country's industry but also to become less dependent on foreign (mostly U.S.) defense technology. One of these efforts includes the development of the KAI KF-X; while dependent on using American General Electric F414 engines, the avionics will be mostly of domestic origin. In January 2019, South Korea changed its defense offset policy to focus more on local production and export than technology transfer with foreign defense contractors. Arms exports were reportedly valued at $1.48 billion in 2019—a 11.5% decrease compared to 2018.

The COVID-19 pandemic, both internationally and in South Korea, had an effect on the country's defense industry. Domestic financial and operational difficulties were incurred, which led the South Korean government to actively support domestic industries and implement changes to increase military exports. The first measure implemented was strengthening coordination between ministries to support defense exports and positioning several domestic-purpose products for export. One such domestic product pushed for export is the KAI KUH-1 Surion.

The second measure to curtail the financial losses experienced was for the South Korean government to spend more on domestic contracts. In mid-June 2020, Defense Minister Jeong Kyeong-doo met with the CEOs of various contractors to discuss ways to adjust to the COVID-19 pandemic. These adjustments included increased government spending on domestic products, moving delivery timelines in light of possible schedule delays, and waiving penalties because of these delays. These domestic defense contracts reportedly include: 20 KAI T-50 aircraft worth ₩688 billion or $570 million delivered from Korea Aerospace Industries (KAI) to the Republic of Korea Air Force, 60 KUH-1 Surion helicopters worth ₩1.3 trillion delivered from KAI to the Republic of Korea Army, K56 ammunition resupply vehicles worth ₩380.3 billion from Hanwha Defense, 30-mm self-propelled anti-aircraft guns (SPAAG) worth ₩251.7 billion from Hanwha Defense, maintenance, repair and operations (MRO) deals on K9 Thunder (₩194.3 billion) and Chunma short-range surface-to-air missiles (₩238.3 billion) from Hanwha Defense, sales of K105A1 self-propelled howitzers and MRO deals on assault amphibious vehicles from Hanwha Defense to the Republic of Korea Marine Corps, combat engineering vehicles worth ₩236.6 billion from Hyundai Rotem, depot maintenance deal worth ₩63.2 billion on armored recovery vehicles and armoured vehicle-launched bridges from Hyundai Rotem. With regards to Hanwha Defense, it is reported that the defense company is performing very well despite the pandemic. The company secured ₩1.2 trillion, or $1 billion, worth of contracts within the first half of 2020 and was expected to secure another ₩1 trillion worth of contracts within the second half.

The third effort was to boost support for the local supply chain by promoting and developing domestic substitutions of imported products or components. In April 2020, the MND invested $37 million to establish a "defense industry innovation cluster" in the city of Changwon with the goal of launching several more "clusters" within the next few years. The purpose of these "clusters" is to support small enterprises in replacing imported components and systems, the funding of which is directed to industry and research institutes to support regional research, development, and production. Another program involves funding small to medium-sized enterprises to develop prototype components and/or subsystems to replace imported versions of the same parts. The funding program is to last for five years, with a maximum funding of $8 million per project. Military products and/or programs supported by the import substitution include the KF-X fighter, KAI Light Armed Helicopter (LAH), active electronically scanned array (AESA) radar, guided air-to-surface missiles, future surface combatants, and local transmissions for the third phase production of the K2 Black Panther. A further boost to the import substitution program came on 15 September 2020, when DAPA and the Ministry of Trade, Industry and Energy (MOTIE) signed an agreement to collaborate on producing indigenous components for military platforms. Under the agreement, the MOTIE allows greater access for local industries to participate in defense projects managed by DAPA. One such project is to develop locally built engines for K9 Thunders in place of German MTU engines.

Independently, South Korea's defense companies have enacted their own measures to adjust to the economic impact of COVID-19. For example, Hyundai Heavy Industries (HHI) announced it would merge its shipbuilding and offshore engineering divisions as part of a restructuring effort. HHI and Daewoo Shipbuilding & Marine Engineering (DSME) have reported that their production have remained largely unaffected by the pandemic.

== Domestic development ==
South Korea's defense industry initially produced copies or license-produced variants of foreign weapons to meet the demands of its military. Through research and development and the experience gained from manufacturing foreign arms, South Korea developed the capability to produce its own basic arms and later more advanced and sophisticated systems. According to the Defense News Top 100 list for 2020, four of South Korea's defense companies were ranked in the top 100 defense companies in the world. These companies are Hanwha (32nd), Korea Aerospace Industries (55th), LIG Nex1 (68th), and Hyundai Rotem (95th).

=== Aerospace sector ===
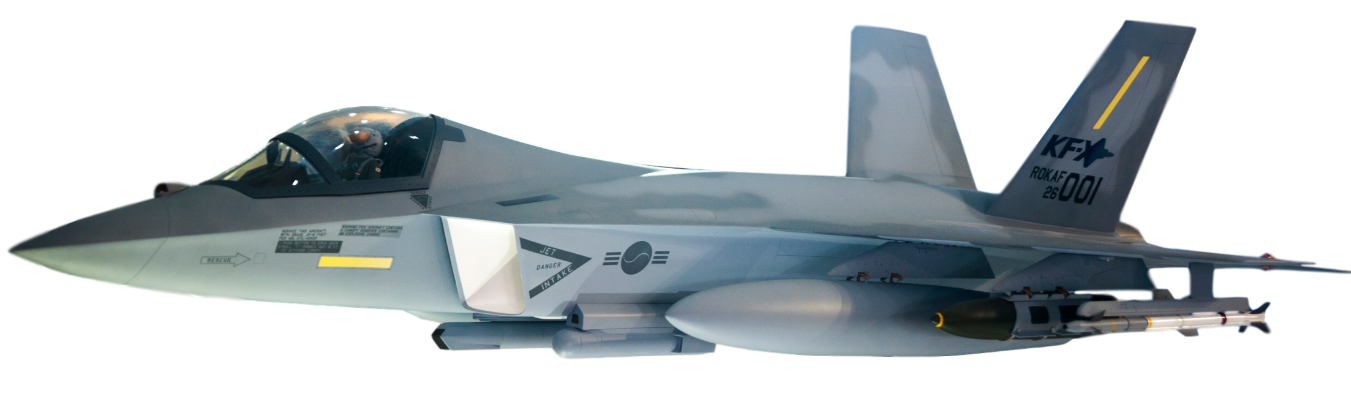
KAI KF-21 Boramae

South Korea's initial experience with the aircraft industry involved maintenance of military aircraft in the 1950s, with improvements in maintenance capabilities occurring in the 1960s. The only company performing these maintenance duties was Korean Air, making it the first Korean aerospace company. Likewise, Korean Air would be the first company to produce aircraft and parts for South Korea. Their (and the country's) first major aerospace program occurred in 1976 by license-producing MD 500 helicopters. Afterwards, in 1979, the country was allowed to license produce Northrop F-5 fighters. A combined total of 68 E and F models were produced by Korean Air between 1980 and 1986.

Samsung Aerospace (SSA) would become the second Korean company involved in the aerospace industry. SSA originally specialized in manufacturing aircraft engines. This contrasted with Korean Air, which focused on aircraft assembly and maintenance. Both would become strong rivals who monopolized their own respective fields. This would change under new government policy that would allow Daewoo Heavy Industries (DHI) and Hyundai Space and Aircraft (HYSA) to enter the aerospace industry in 1984 and 1987, respectively. This was done to promote competition among the Korean conglomerates. Around this time, the dominance in South Korea's aerospace industry would begin to shift, and active participation in the defense industry would arise. Korean Air would begin to lose its manufacturing edge as its experienced engineers began to join SSA and DHI. HYSA would assemble BK 117 helicopters from Kawasaki Heavy Industries. However, this was considered an unprofitable venture as HYSA did not gain much technological assets or experience from it. SSA and DHI became emerging powers as well as rivals. This is primarily because both companies were competing to be awarded what was then South Korea's biggest aerospace project: a license to produce F-16 fighters for the South Korean air force's Korean Fighter Program (KFP). This is done to counter North Korean MiG-29s and Su-25s, as well as gain expertise in developing future fighter aircraft. In 1986, SSA was ultimately selected to cooperate with General Dynamics in co-producing F-16s between 1996 and 2000. This decision would solidify SSA's dominance in South Korea's aerospace industry. In addition, SSA would be tasked with developing the KTX-2 advanced trainer with Lockheed Martin based on the technology and experience gained from the KFP. Moreover, in 1990, Samsung Aerospace would begin to license-produce UH-60 helicopters for the South Korean Army. Meanwhile, Korean Air would be relegated to manufacturing helicopters and maintaining US aircraft stationed in East Asia. DHI would be tasked with developing the KTX-1 basic trainer with ADD, gaining the needed experience from it. HYSA was treading on thin ice, being unable to develop or acquire technologies or capabilities for manufacturing military aircraft and thus unable to secure government contracts. Instead, they focused on manufacturing wings and large airframes by participating in the MD-95 wing project, which itself was a difficult task for HSYA.

South Korea's capability to develop indigenous missiles originated from performing maintenance on MIM-23 Hawk and Nike Hercules missiles in 1972. The South Korean company in charge of the maintenance was GoldStar Precision. After gaining enough expertise, South Korea developed its first of a series of ballistic missiles, the Hyunmoo-1 based on the Nike Hercules missiles. GoldStar Precision would later become LIG Nex1, which continues to develop advanced missiles and equipment for the South Korean military. Additionally, South Korea would also modernize MGR-1 Honest John missiles.

After the Cold War, leading aircraft companies around the world have been forced to consolidate in their countries, merging and acquiring others to lower development costs and risks amidst an era of uncertainty in the aircraft market. Leading aircraft companies would also begin to cooperate with each other to develop new aircraft for economic reasons. The 1997 Asian financial crisis forced South Korea to consolidate its aerospace industry for the same reasons. The rivalry between the aircraft companies reduced their competitiveness, and the South Korean government was in desperate need of a more streamlined aerospace manufacturer for the country. The decision was made to merge SSA, DHI, and HYSA under a single entity. Korean Air opted not to join, but by that point, it was not as heavily involved in manufacturing aircraft as it used to. On October 1, 1999, all three aircraft companies merged to become Korea Aerospace Industry (KAI), South Korea's sole aircraft manufacturer. KAI inherited the aircraft programs the previous companies were working on, as well as embarking on several projects to develop aircraft domestically for the armed forces. KAI produced the KT-1 basic trainer from DHI's work on the KTX-1 program. KAI would cooperate with Lockheed Martin to produce additional F-16s for the KFP. In the early 2000s, KAI successfully developed the T-50 advanced trainer from SSA's work on the KTX-2 program. The T-50 is South Korea's first domestically produced supersonic aircraft and has been widely produced and exported. It is considered one of the most advanced trainer aircraft, and the FA-50 variant has been made as a light combat aircraft. At the same time, the F-15K would be selected as a fighter in the F-X fighter program, leading to its co-production between KAI and Boeing. The KUH-1 and LAH helicopters were co-developed with assistance from Airbus Helicopters (formerly called Eurocopter). The KF-X fighter is South Korea's second domestically produced fighter, with the goal of becoming an advanced multi-role fighter to replace South Korea's aging F-4 and F-5 fighters and potentially becoming exportable. In 2015, KAI was awarded the contract by DAPA to develop the KF-X. The aircraft's development is planned to be completed by 2026, with mass production beginning in 2028. KAI would also develop UAVs of various sizes and purposes for military and civilian usage.

In late 2020, KAI announced it would begin to develop military transport aircraft, allowing South Korea to enter the military transport market.

=== Shipbuilding ===
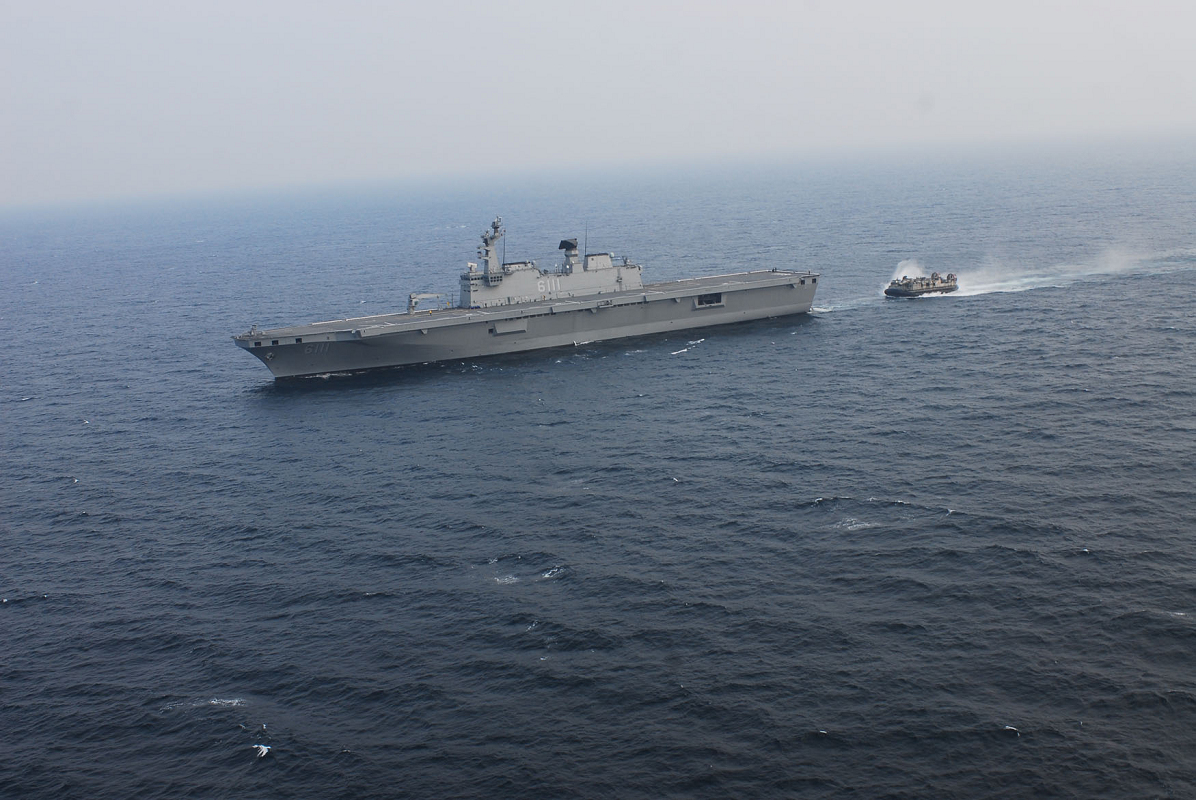
Dokdo conducts well deck operations with a US Navy LCAC.

The South Korean Navy was formed as a green-water navy designed to counter North Korean insurgent operations. As such, early warship production involved manufacturing high-speed patrol boats to guard South Korea's coast. In 1972, South Korea made its first patrol boat, the Haksaeng-class patrol boat (renamed and donated to the Philippines as the Conrado Yap-class patrol craft). The first shipbuilding companies involved in manufacturing warships were Korea Shipbuilding & Engineering Corp. (KSEC) and Korea Tacoma Marine Industries Ltd., both of which produced many of South Korea's earliest warships, such as the aforementioned Haksaeng-class and Chamsuri-class patrol boats. Later, Hyundai Heavy Industries (HHI) and Daewoo Shipbuilding & Marine Engineering (DSME) (under Daewoo Group until 1999) would join in producing warships. All four companies cooperated with each other in producing corvettes and frigates during the 1980s to bolster South Korea's anti-submarine warfare capabilities.^{α} In 1989, KSEC was renamed Hanjin Heavy Industries Co. Ltd. (HHIC) and acquired Korea Tacoma in 1999.

As South Korea's shipbuilding industry grew, so did its desire and capabilities to build larger and more advanced warships. South Korea's shipbuilding industry is the largest in the world, possessing some of the largest and most advanced shipyards, with the shipbuilding industry accounting for 6.5 percent of the country's GDP. South Korea's expertise in shipbuilding gives it an advantage in constructing larger warships; it has the infrastructure, technologies, and skills necessary to construct warships. In the 1990s, South Korea began to construct larger ships and submarines to enhance its navy, and by the 2000s, the country began to pursue its desire to establish a blue-water navy. Part of this desire is to match China and Japan's growing naval development and capabilities, as South Korea has territorial disputes with both countries. HHI, DSME, and HHIC would play a big role in manufacturing larger, more advanced warships under various programs to meet this realization. Two very important programs are the Korean Destroyer eXperimental (KDX) program and the Korean Attack Submarine program, both of which aim to develop larger and more capable destroyers and submarines under different phases for South Korea's growing navy.

The destroyer program was originally divided into three phases. The first phase led to the creation of the KDX-1 (Gwanggaeto the Great-class destroyer) in the late 1990s. Between the 2000s and early 2010s, South Korea developed six KDX-II (Chungmugong Yi Sun-sin-class destroyers) and three KDX-III (Sejong the Great-class destroyers). The KDX-II offered greater capabilities than the KDX-1, while the KDX-III is the largest Aegis-equipped vessel in the world, although it is not outfitted for ballistic missile defense. Both classes of destroyers enhance the ROK Navy's offensive and defensive capabilities. South Korea announced it would construct six more variants of the KDX-II destroyer, designated KDX-IIA. The KDX-IIA is said to be larger than the KDX-II, equipped with the Aegis Combat System, and could possibly be exported to other countries.

The submarine program is also divided into three phases: KSS-I, KSS-II, and KSS-III. The first two classes of submarines were made with assistance from the German naval firm Howaldtswerke-Deutsche Werft. The KSS-I (Jang Bogo-class) is a licensed-produced variant of Germany's Type 209 submarine. The KSS-II (Type 214 submarine) is also licensed-produced in Germany. The KSS-II offered greater technology, such as air-independent propulsion (AIP), and more involvement for South Korean companies during its construction. Unlike the first two classes, the KSS-III (Dosan Ahn Changho-class) is of indigenous design. The KSS-III is larger and heavier than its predecessors and will offer greater improvements and capabilities, such as having a vertical launching system for cruise or ballistic missiles and introducing lithium-ion batteries for greater underwater endurance. A total of nine KSS-III submarines are planned to be produced in three batches, each with three submarines. The second batch of KSS-IIIs will be larger than the first batch to accommodate additional VLS and more South Korean technologies, and will be the first South Korean submarines to use lithium-ion batteries. The last batch of KSS-IIIs is described to be even more advanced than the other batches and is rumored to be nuclear-powered.

Another program introduced is the Future Frigate eXperimental (FFX) program, the goal of which is to develop new, advanced frigates to replace the Pohang-class corvettes and Ulsan-class frigates. This led to the creation of the Incheon-class frigate in 2011 and, subsequently, the Daegu-class frigate (FFG-II) in 2016 and a planned FFG-III frigate. A combined total of 12–30 frigates are planned to be created from all three classes. The Yoon Youngha-class patrol vessel would be produced to replace the aging Chamsuri-class patrol boats. South Korea would also develop amphibious warfare ships, such as the Cheon Wang Bong-class LST and Dokdo-class amphibious assault ship. The Dokdo class in particular is said to be the centerpiece of South Korea's strategic mobile fleets, acting as the flagship.

On 30 April 2019, DAPA announced the construction of a second batch of three Sejong the Great-class destroyers and Dosan Ahn Changho-class submarines. The two projects are worth a total of ₩7.3 trillion ($6.3 billion), with construction of the ships completing within the late 2020s and offering a number of improvements over the first batch of ships. The second batch of Sejong the Great destroyers will have the ability to intercept ballistic missiles. On 14 August 2019, South Korea announced plans to produce a 30,000-ton light aircraft carrier (LPX-II) as part of its five-year defense plan between 2020 and 2024. In October 2019, HHI was awarded the contract to build the LPX-II. On 29 May 2020, DAPA started a bidding process to develop a future class of six destroyers dubbed the KDDX. The KDDX program aims to develop an "Original Korean Destroyer" using advanced domestic technologies. The design of the KDDX is expected to be completed by 2023 and will be constructed starting in 2024. HHI and DSME are competing to be selected to develop the future destroyer. Similarly, six FFG-III frigates will be constructed, with the initial batch being completed by 2024.

=== Ground forces ===
Most of South Korea's domestic weapons are produced for its ground forces, as its military is primarily designed to fight a potential North Korean land invasion. In the beginning, South Korea fielded US-made weapons and vehicles, such as the M16 rifles, M48 tanks, and M113 APC. The earliest programs for vehicles involved maintaining and upgrading these vehicles with assistance from the US.

Between the 1970s and 1980s, South Korea embarked on domestically developing many conventional weapons and equipment for its ground forces. In 1976, South Korea licensed-produced the KM900 from Italy and later developed the K200 KIFV. After being denied the acquisition of the M60 tank, South Korea embarked on its first domestic tank development in 1980. Under supervision from General Dynamics Land Systems, Hyundai Precision (now Hyundai Rotem) would develop the XK1 prototype based on the M1 Abrams prototype, XM1. The prototype would be delivered and tested in 1984, followed by mass production in 1985. The tank was finally revealed to the public in 1987 and would officially enter service in 1988 under the designation of the K1 88-Tank. Similarly, in the 1980s, Samsung Techwin (now Hanwha Techwin) would develop indigenous artillery systems based on US-designed artillery. These include the K55, KH-178, and KH-179. The success and experience gained from these designs would lead to the development of the K9 Thunder beginning in 1989. Daewoo Precision Industries (now S&T Motiv) would also develop domestic firearms for the ground forces: K1, K2, K3, and K5. The K1 submachine gun alone would have 180,000 units produced and be exported by the time its successor was announced.

Unmanned ground vehicles and other autonomous technologies have been developed for South Korea's ground forces. In mid-2020, South Korea announced the development of an unmanned K1 88-tank and a K9 Thunder SPH.

== Export ==
South Korea is one of the largest arms exporters in the world, having successfully sold numerous advanced military hardware to many countries. Between 2010 and 2014, South Korea exported its weapons to only seven countries, with more than half of the exports going to Turkey. Between 2015 and 2019, the number of countries purchasing South Korean military hardware increased to 17. This means that by 2019, South Korea's exports had grown by 143 percent, essentially more than doubling from the 2010–2014 period. Countries from Asia and Oceania accounted for 50 percent of South Korea's arms exports, while 24 percent came from European countries and 17 percent from the Middle East. In 2018, South Korea was ranked as the 11th largest arms exporter in the world by SIPRI. The country's top three clients were Indonesia, Iraq, and the United Kingdom. In 2019, South Korea became the 10th largest arms exporter, according to the same study conducted by SIPRI, making it the first time South Korea entered the top 10 list. The country's main clients in 2019 are still Indonesia, Iraq, and the UK.

=== Aircraft/Missiles ===
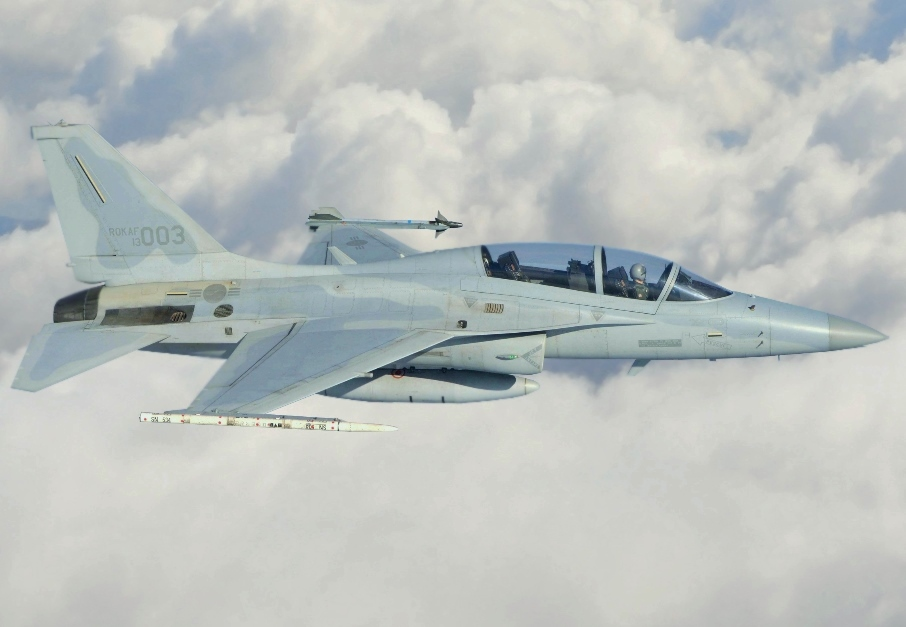
KAI T-50 Golden Eagle

The KAI T-50 is one of South Korea's most successfully exported weapons platforms and has been credited with South Korea's increased arms exports. Despite some failed bids, the T-50 has been exported to the Philippines, Iraq, Indonesia, Malaysia, Thailand, and Poland as well as to a number of countries expressing interest in procuring the aircraft, such as Argentina.

The KAI KUH-1 helicopter is being exported with assistance from Airbus. Armed variants have been showcased to attract customers from Southeast Asia, South America, and Africa who are in need of both utility and attack helicopters. The KUH-1 was further pushed for export to offset financial losses from the COVID-19 pandemic. Indonesia, Malaysia, Colombia, and Peru have expressed interest in purchasing the helicopter. KAI KT-1 Woongbi trainers have been exported to Indonesia, Turkey, Senegal, and Peru.

The KF-21 Boramae fighter program is jointly financed by Indonesia. Indonesia is contributing 20 percent of the development cost—about ₩8.8 trillion, or $7.3 billion. A number of countries have already expressed interest in acquiring the aircraft, such as the Philippines, Peru and Malaysia.

The M-SAM, has been exported by LIG-Nex1 to Saudi Arabia, Iraq and United Arab Emirates.

=== Warships ===
South Korea's shipbuilding sector is quite successful in exporting warships to other countries. The country's own expertise in shipbuilding makes it less reliant on foreign technologies compared to its aircraft and ground vehicle production. This gives South Korea's shipbuilding an advantage as it can bypass export restrictions imposed by another country.

Indonesia purchased six Jang Bogo-class submarines from DSME, the first batch of three on 20 December 2011, for $1.1 billion, and a second batch of three on 12 April 2019, for ₩1.16 trillion ($1.02 billion). These purchases made South Korea the fifth-largest submarine exporter in the world at the time of the second deal. Similarly, DSME delivered the Bhumibol Adulyadej-class frigate, a modern variant of the Gwanggaeto the Great-class destroyer, to Thailand in December 2018. DSME has also manufactured the Tide-class tankers for the UK and Norway.

Hyundai Heavy Industries exported two Jose Rizal-class frigates, which are modified Incheon-class frigates, to the Philippines. The contract was awarded to HHI in October 2016 for $311 million. The lead ship was launched in Ulsan, South Korea, on 23 May 2019. Sea trial occurred between 23 and 27 November 2019, and then delivered to the Philippines on 18 May 2020. The second ship was launched on 8 November 2019, in the same city. Hyundai Heavy Industries also delivered four Miguel Malvar-class frigates and six Rajah Sulayman-class patrol vessels. The delivery of those ships is considered extremely important to the Philippine Navy, as the ships are modern frigates and patrol vessels, in contrast to the old and aging patrol ships that initially make up the majority of the Philippine fleet. HHI constructed HMNZS Aotearoa for the Royal New Zealand Navy for $327 million. The ship was launched on 25 April 2019 and underwent sea trials in December 2019. The ship was delivered to New Zealand in June 2020.

South Korea's DAE SUN Shipbuilding & Engineering Co., Ltd. developed the Makassar-class landing platform dock for the Indonesian Navy. The Philippines, Peru, and Myanmar also operate this class of ship. The future KDX-IIA is planned to be exportable.

=== Ground vehicles/weapons ===
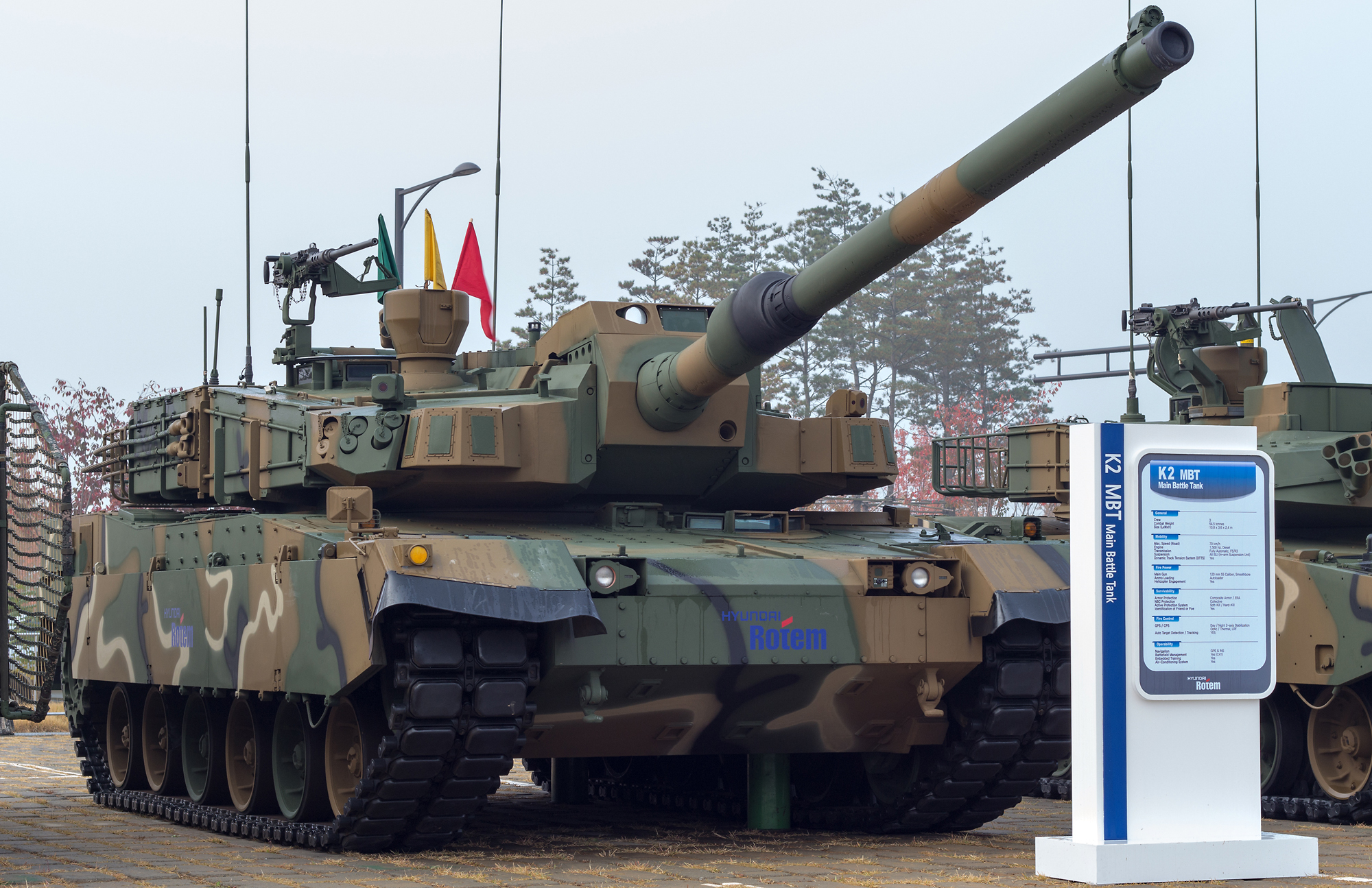
K2 Black Panther

The K9 Thunder is described as South Korea's most popular export and one of the most popular self-propelled howitzers in the world. This is due to its competitive performance and price range. The self-propelled artillery has been exported to Poland, India, Australia, Egypt, Norway, and many other nations. South Korea and Turkey co-developed the T-155 Fırtına based on the K9 Thunder. On 3 September 2020, Australia announced that 30 K9 Thunders and 15 K10 ammunition resupply vehicles would be purchased for ₩1 trillion ($843 million) as part of the country's Land 8116 Artillery Replacement project. The deal has been described as important because of Australia's affiliation as one of the Five Eyes, which would present a reputational boost to Hanwha Defense and subsequently South Korea's defense industry. In October 2020, Hanwha Defense Australia released concept images of the Australian K9 and K10 vehicles, now named the Huntsman AS9 and AS10. Other countries interested in the K9 Thunder include Egypt, the UAE, Saudi Arabia, Romania, and the UK.

The K2 Black Panther main battle tank is another land vehicle that is being exported. The tank has been sought in large quantities by Poland and Oman, as well as co-developed with Turkey to produce the Altay tank.

AS21 Redback IFV
A variant of the K21 called the AS21 Redback IFV was proposed to the Australian Army for its Land 300 Phase 3 procurement program. The program was originally looking for 450 IFVs to replace Australia's M113AS4 APCs and was worth up to ₩5 trillion. The Redback and its competitor, Rheinmetall's Lynx KF41, were the final two candidates selected on 16 September 2019. On 26 July 2020, Hanwha Defense rolled out two Redbacks to be delivered to Australia in August for testing. A third prototype was rolled out on 18 December 2020, and was expected to be delivered to Australia in mid-January 2021 to undergo testing.

In July 2023, the AS21 Redback was announced as the successful bidder for the Land 300 program. 129 Redbacks will be built in Australia at an estimated cost between AU$5 billion (USD$3.4 billion) and AU$7 billion ($US4.7 billion).

== Impact ==
Former Commissioner of DAPA, Byun Moo-keun, describes the defense industry (in the past and present tense) as both an economic stimulant and technological innovation hub for South Korea because of its economic contribution and its effect on other industries through research, development, and implementation of dual-use technology. Beginning in the 1970s under the reign of President Park Chung Hee, South Korea's defense industry has contributed to South Korea's rapid industrialization. This was due to Park's policy of heavily investing in the heavy-chemical industries for the sake of national security. As such, the defense industry has been diversified across other industries, which has allowed investments and development to go both ways. The early successes of industrialization attracted massive foreign capital investment. However, the overemphasis on developing the defense industry partially contributed to South Korea's economic crisis between the late 1970s and mid-1980s. In terms of overall economic contribution, the defense industry contributed about 1 percent of growth to the country's gross national product (GNP) between 1975 and 1989, although it could have arguably contributed more had the South Korean government not overemphasized it. However, the technological advances within the defense industry would also spill over to other industrial sectors of the country, which in turn would increase the country's overall GNP and exportation.

Despite the problems, South Korea's defense industry played a role in improving the country's education. Since the defense industry initially lacked skilled workers, scientists, and engineers, the government took several measures to rectify this problem. The country recruited foreign engineers and, especially, Korean-born scientists and engineers living abroad, as well as sent Korean students overseas to study. Large investments in education were made as new facilities and educational institutions were created to teach young Koreans various fields of engineering. While these efforts were made to get skilled engineers and scientists for the defense industry, these well-educated Koreans have gone on to improve the private sector and academic training institutions across the country.

The creation of the defense industry also paved the way for new employment opportunities. At the time of its creation, the country was looking to bolster its military; thus, domestic production would be needed to meet the demands of the military. Combined with South Korea's large number of military personnel, the defense industry would contribute to reducing unemployment. By 1982, the unemployment rate was reduced to 4.4 percent. In 1987, the defense industry employed a little more than 35,000 individuals, or 1.68 percent of the total employment in the manufacturing industry. Within the aerospace and industrial chemical sectors, the defense industry would contribute between 8 and 9 percent of the total employment. This would mean that the defense industry contributed greatly to employment opportunities as well as a production shift from conventional arms to more advanced weapon systems. By 2016, South Korea's defense industry reportedly employed 38,000 individuals.

== Challenges ==
One of the biggest challenges the South Korean defense industry faces is its continuous dependency on foreign technologies. Although this issue has been and is still being addressed, South Korea still struggles to develop some technologies domestically, forcing the country to import what it can't develop in time. This can lead to delays and cost overruns, especially if South Korea can't acquire the components from another country. In April 2015, the US denied the transfer of an AESA radar, electro-optical targeting pod, infrared search and track systems, and radio frequency jammer to South Korea for their KF-X fighter program. This transfer refusal was kept secret until September, when DAPA announced it, and reaffirmed in October during President Park Geun-hye's visit to the US. This was considered a major setback as it forced South Korea to develop the four key technologies on its own, increasing costs and delaying the KF-X project further. The tech transfer refusal also caused a stir amongst the South Korean public and government, not only because of DAPA's coverup but also because it put into question DAPA's selection of the F-35 in the F-X III fighter program. It has been speculated that the F-35 was selected to acquire 25 key technologies needed for the KF-X, four of which are unobtainable.

South Korea's domestic arms development has been hindered by defects or lackluster results in several of the industry's defense products. In 2010, 38 of 500 K9 Thunder engines were damaged by faulty maintenance due to the use of cheap antifreeze. The K21 IFV was redesigned following two incidents of it sinking during amphibious operations; one of the incidents killed a soldier. The defects in the K21 were revealed to be caused by a lack of buoyancy, malfunctioning of the waveplate, and problems with the drain pump. The K11 assault rifle has been found to be defective. Problems and cost overruns with the K11 project would continue until 2019, when the government recommended canceling the project entirely. Specifically, South Korea has had a long period of difficulties in the development of domestic engines and transmission systems for its K2 tanks. The first batch of K2s (100 tanks) was originally meant to use a powerpack that uses a domestic engine and transmission system developed by Doosan Infracore and S&T Dynamics. However, reliability and durability problems in both components forced South Korea to import German powerpacks using MTU engines and Renk transmissions. This in turn delayed the K2's deployment until December 2013 in an attempt to fix the domestic powerpack, and then until March 2014 to ensure that the German powerpacks worked. By the time of the second batch of K2s (106 tanks), the domestic engine had been produced. Unfortunately, South Korea's efforts to develop the domestic transmission system continued to struggle as it failed durability tests six times. As a result, the production of the second batch of K2s, which originally was to start in 2014, was delayed to 2018, with deployment occurring between 2019 and 2020. On 7 February 2018, DAPA announced it would continue to adopt the German Renk transmission system, effectively making the second batch of K2s operate on a hybrid powerpack consisting of a South Korean engine and German transmission. Although in mid-2020 DAPA announced its commitment to developing the local transmission system for the third batch of K2s (54 tanks), on 25 November, DAPA decided to continue to use the German Renk transmission system as the local transmission failed the durability test again. By the time of the 25 November announcement, South Korea had struggled to develop its domestic transmission system for 15 years. The third batch of K2s will follow the second batch in using the hybrid powerpack.

Moreover, the reliance on foreign components can also restrict South Korea's exports since the country that developed the imported parts can prevent the export of the whole weapon system. In the past, the US Arms Export Control Act and International Traffic in Arms Regulations have hindered South Korea's arms exports to Third World countries, as South Korea's arms are often made with US components. For Saudi Arabia and the UAE, Germany banned the export of the K9 Thunder to either country due to the artillery using German engines. South Korea announced it would develop its own engines for the K9 to become more self-reliant and circumvent the export restriction imposed by another country. Similarly, Germany placed an arms embargo on Turkey, preventing the country from obtaining German MTU engines and Renk transmissions for its Altay tank, the same ones used for the K2 tanks. Turkey sought South Korea's aid to help recover the Altay program by using a South Korean engine and transmission. This, however, raises concerns over the viability of that option, as South Korea has failed to develop its transmission system. In October 2020, the UK barred South Korea from selling FA-50 aircraft to Argentina. The sale was prevented because of an existing arms embargo the UK imposed on Argentina following the Falklands War. The FA-50 uses six parts of British origin. Argentina selected the FA-50 to replace their aging A-4 Skyhawk and act as an interim replacement for the retired Mirage III fighters.

While South Korea's defense industry has greatly contributed to employment in the past, it has been reported to create very few job opportunities in recent times. In 2017, the Korea Institute for Industrial Economics & Trade reported that in 2016, the defense industry accounted for only 0.9 percent of employment in South Korea's manufacturing industry, despite receiving 10 percent of the government's budget. Job growth was 4.1 percent, compared to 23.9 percent in 2011. This is in stark contrast to Israel and the United States, which both spend similar percentages of their government budget on their national defense. For Israel and the US, their defense industries greatly contribute to job creation and the economy. The report warned that South Korea's neglect of domestic productivity in the defense industry can lead to a decline in technological innovation and industrial competitiveness.

== Notes ==
^α The corvettes and frigates mentioned are the Donghae-class corvette, Pohang-class corvette, and Ulsan-class frigate.
