= ROKS Jeongjo the Great =

South Korean naval ship

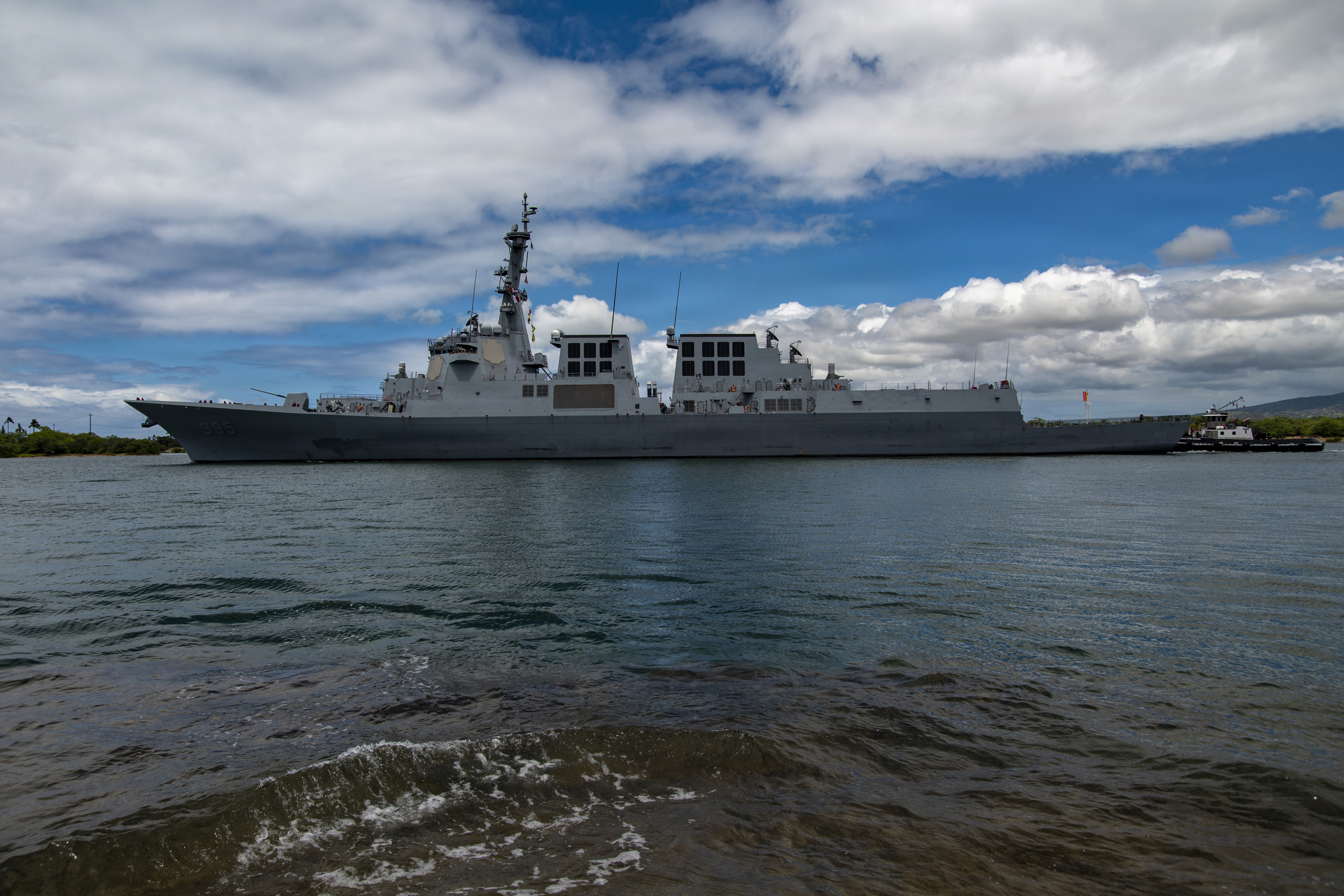
- ROKS Jeongjo the Great in June 2026

South Korea
- Name: Jeongjo the Great; (정조대왕)
- Namesake: Jeongjo of Joseon
- Builder: Hyundai
- Launched: 28 July 2022
- Commissioned: 27 November 2024
- Identification: Pennant number: DDG-995
- Status: In active service

General characteristics
- Class & type: Sejong the Great-class (Batch II) destroyer
- Displacement: 8,500 tons standard; 10,000 tons full load
- Length: 165 m (541 ft 4 in)
- Beam: 21.4 m (70 ft 3 in)
- Draft: 6.25 m (20 ft 6 in)
- Propulsion: 4 × General Electric LM2500 COGAG; 2 × shafts; 100,000 shp (75 MW) produced power
- Speed: exceeds 30 knots (56 km/h; 35 mph)
- Range: 5,500 nautical miles (10,200 km; 6,300 mi)
- Endurance: 30 days
- Complement: 300 crew
- Sensors & processing systems: AN/SPY-1D(V) multi-function radar; AN/SPG-62 fire control radar; DSQS-21BZ-M hull mounted sonar; SQR-220K towed array sonar system; Sagem Infrared Search & Track (IRST) system
- Electronic warfare & decoys: LIG Nex1 SLQ-200K Sonata electronic warfare suite
- Armament: 1 × 5 inch (127 mm)/L62 caliber Mk 45 Mod 4 naval gun; 1 × 30 mm Phalanx CIWS; 8 × SSM-700K Haeseong Anti-ship Missiles; 48-cell Mk 41 VLS for: SM-2 Block IIIB; SM-3; SM-6; 16-cell K-VLS for: K-SAAM; K-ASROC Red Shark; Haeryong Tactical Surface Launch Missile land attack cruise missiles; 24-cell K-VLS II for: Cheongung 3(L SAM)
- Aircraft carried: 2 × Super Lynx or MH-60R Seahawk
- Aviation facilities: Hangar and helipad

ROKS Jeongjo the Great (DDG-995) is the fourth ship of the Sejong the Great class of guided missile destroyers built for the Republic of Korea Navy (ROKN), and the first of four KDX III Batch II ships to be built. She is the fourth Aegis-built destroyer of the service and was named after the 22nd monarch of the Joseon dynasty of Korea, Jeongjo of Joseon.

== Background ==
The Sejong the Great class is the third phase of the ROKN's Korean Destroyer eXperimental (KDX) program, a substantial shipbuilding program, which is geared toward enhancing ROKN's ability to successfully defend the maritime areas around South Korea from various modes of threats, as well as becoming a blue-water navy. The Batch II ships of the KDX III are based on the first three ships of the Sejong the Great class, with improved sensors and armament.

Unlike the existing Sejong the Great-class Aegis destroyers, Jeongjo the Great is equipped with the newer Aegis Combat System Baseline 9.C2 ‘KII’ combined with AN/SPY-1D(V) multi-function radar antennae. This will allow the Batch II ships to use the RIM-161 Standard Missile 3 and RIM-174 Standard Missile 6, in addition to the ROK Navy's current RIM-66 Standard Missile 2 missiles, from the Mark 41 Vertical Launching System.

At 8,500 tons standard displacement and 10,000 tons full load, the KDX-III Sejong the Great destroyers are by far the largest destroyers in the South Korean Navy, and indeed are larger than most destroyers in the navies of other countries, and built slightly bulkier and heavier than Arleigh Burke-class destroyers or Atago-class destroyers to accommodate 32 more missiles. As such, some analysts believe that this class of ships is more appropriately termed a class of cruisers rather than destroyers.

== Construction and career ==
ROKS Jeongjo the Great was launched on 28 July 2022 by Hyundai Heavy Industries. She was delivered to the ROKN and commissioned on November 27, 2024.
