= KDX-IIA =

Ship class

Class overview
- Builders: Hyundai Heavy Industries; Daewoo Shipbuilding & Marine Engineering
- Operators: Republic of Korea Navy
- Preceded by: Chungmugong Yi Sun-shin class
- Cost: $500~700 million
- Planned: 6 (not confirmed)
- Building: 0
- Completed: 0

General characteristics
- Type: Destroyer
- Displacement: 5600~7000 tons
- Length: 150 m (492 ft 2 in)
- Beam: 17.4 m (57 ft 1 in)
- Draft: 9.5 m (31 ft 2 in)
- Propulsion: CODOG
- Speed: 29 knots (54 km/h; 33 mph)
- Complement: 300
- Notes: Class reorganized under the Korea Next-Generation Destroyer (KDDX) Program

KDX-IIA is an Aegis Combat System armed variant of the KDX-II, Chungmugong Yi Sun-sin-class destroyer of the Republic of Korea Navy (ROKN). As of 2011 ROKN planned to build at least 6 ships of this class with a proposed displacement of 5500 ~ 7500 tons over the 2019 to 2026 time frame. It is the final part of the Korean Destroyer eXperimental program. Although the South Korean government has not released detailed documents about this class, it is likely to use stealth technology like KDX-II as well as having a more integrated sonar and better data link capabilities. All of these improvements are expected to enhance littoral combat as well as blue-water capabilities.

The ROKN expects it to make up a major part of the fleet. Each unit will cost around $500~$700 million.

This project has been revised into the Korean Next-Generation Destroyer (KDDX) program.

== See also ==
- Aegis Combat System
- Korean Destroyer eXperimental
- Republic of Korea Navy
- KDX-II
