= ROKS Sejong the Great =

Sejong the Great-class destroyer

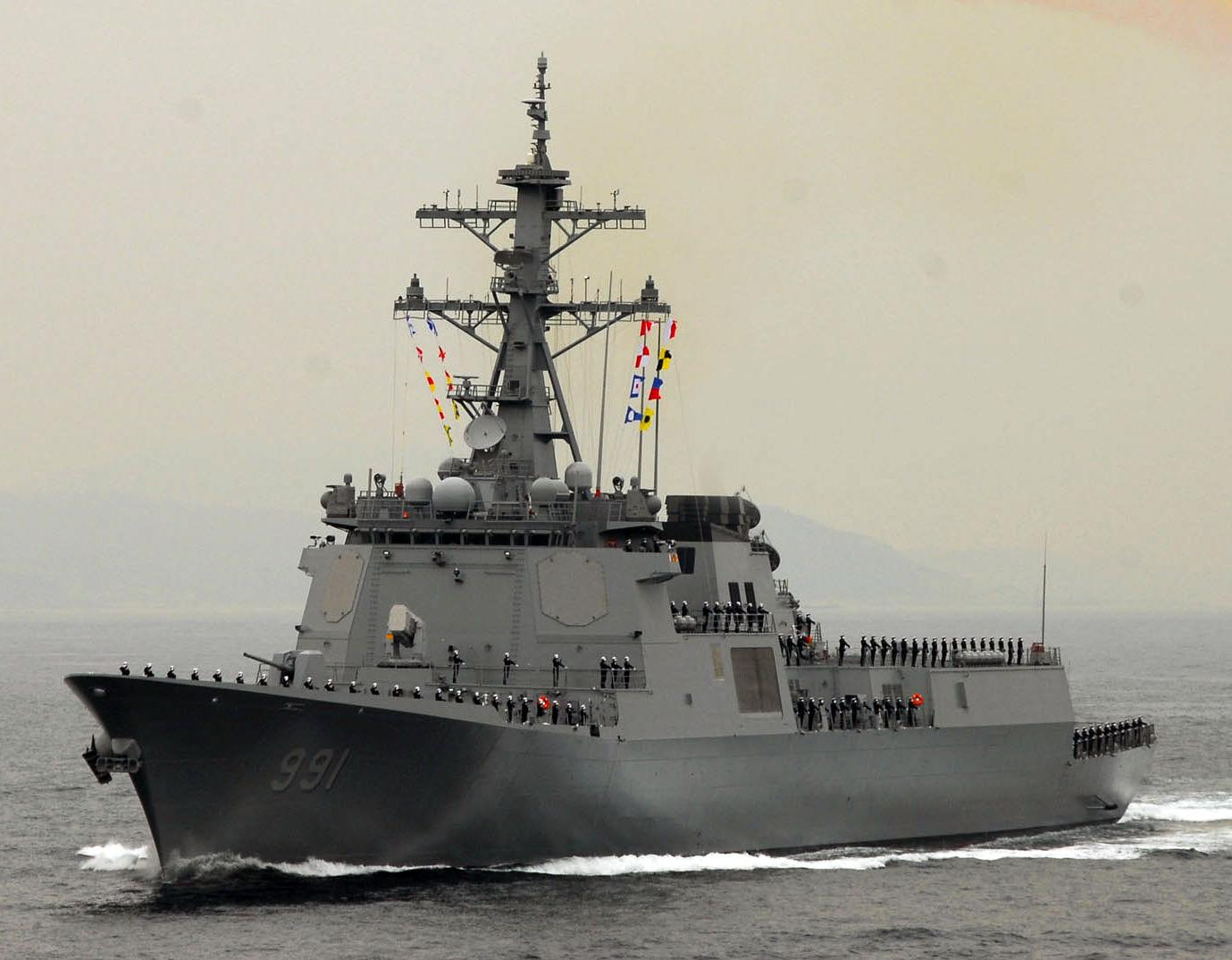
- ROKS Sejong the Great during the Busan International Fleet Review on 7 October 2008.

South Korea
- Name: Sejong the Great; (세종대왕/世宗大王)
- Namesake: Sejong the Great
- Builder: Hyundai
- Launched: 25 May 2007
- Commissioned: 22 December 2008
- Identification: Pennant number: DDG-991
- Status: Active

General characteristics
- Class & type: Sejong the Great-class destroyer
- Displacement: 8,500 tons standard displacement; 10,000 tons full load
- Length: 166 m (544 ft 7 in)
- Beam: 21.4 m (70 ft 3 in)
- Draft: 6.25 m (20 ft 6 in)
- Propulsion: 4 × General Electric LM2500 COGAG; 2 × shafts; 100,000 shp (75 MW) produced power
- Speed: exceeds 30 knots (56 km/h; 35 mph)
- Range: 5,500 nautical miles (10,200 km; 6,300 mi)
- Endurance: 30 days
- Complement: 300 crew
- Sensors & processing systems: AN/SPY-1D(V) multi-function radar; AN/SPG-62 fire control radar; DSQS-21BZ-M hull mounted sonar; SQR-220K towed array sonar system; Sagem Infrared Search & Track (IRST) system
- Electronic warfare & decoys: LIG Nex1 SLQ-200K Sonata electronic warfare suite
- Armament: 1 × 5 inch (127 mm)/L62 caliber Mk 45 Mod 4 naval gun; 1 × 30 mm Goalkeeper CIWS; 1 × RAM Block 1 CIWS; 16 × SSM-700K Haeseong Anti-ship Missiles; 2 × triple torpedo tubes for K745 Blue Shark torpedo; 80-cell Mk 41 VLS for SM-2 Block IIIB/IV; 48-cell K-VLS for: K-ASROC Red Shark; Hyunmoo III land attack cruise missiles
- Aircraft carried: 2 × Super Lynx or SH-60 Seahawk
- Aviation facilities: Hangar and helipad

ROKS Sejong the Great (DDG-991) is the lead ship of her class of guided missile destroyer built for the Republic of Korea Navy. She was the first Aegis-built destroyer of the service and was named after the fourth king of the Joseon dynasty of Korea, Sejong the Great.

== Background ==
The ship features the Aegis Combat System (Baseline 7 Phase 1) combined with AN/SPY-1D multi-function radar antennae.

The Sejong the Great class is the third phase of the South Korean navy's Korean Destroyer eXperimental (KDX) program, a substantial shipbuilding program, which is geared toward enhancing ROKN's ability to successfully defend the maritime areas around South Korea from various modes of threats as well as becoming a blue-water navy.

At 8,500 tons standard displacement and 10,000 tons full load, the KDX-III Sejong the Great destroyers are the largest destroyers in the South Korean Navy, and are larger than most destroyers of other navies. and built slightly bulkier and heavier than Arleigh Burke-class destroyers or Atago-class destroyers to accommodate 32 more missiles. As such, some analysts believe that this class of ships is more appropriately termed a class of cruisers rather than destroyers.

== Construction and career ==
ROKS Sejong the Great was launched on 25 May 2007 by Hyundai Heavy Industries. She was commissioned into the ROK Navy on 22 December 2008.

=== RIMPAC Exercise ===
Republic of Korea Navy (ROKN) has actively participated in the recent iterations of the RIMPAC, which is a unique training opportunity that helps participants foster and sustain cooperative relationships. On 23 June 2010, ROKS Sejong the Great participated in RIMPAC 2010.

She again participated in 2016 RIMPAC exercises along with ROKS Kang Gam-chan, and submarine ROKS Lee Eokgi of the ROKN.

Sejong the Great again participated in RIMPAC 2022.

== Gallery ==
ROKS Sejong the Great Gallery

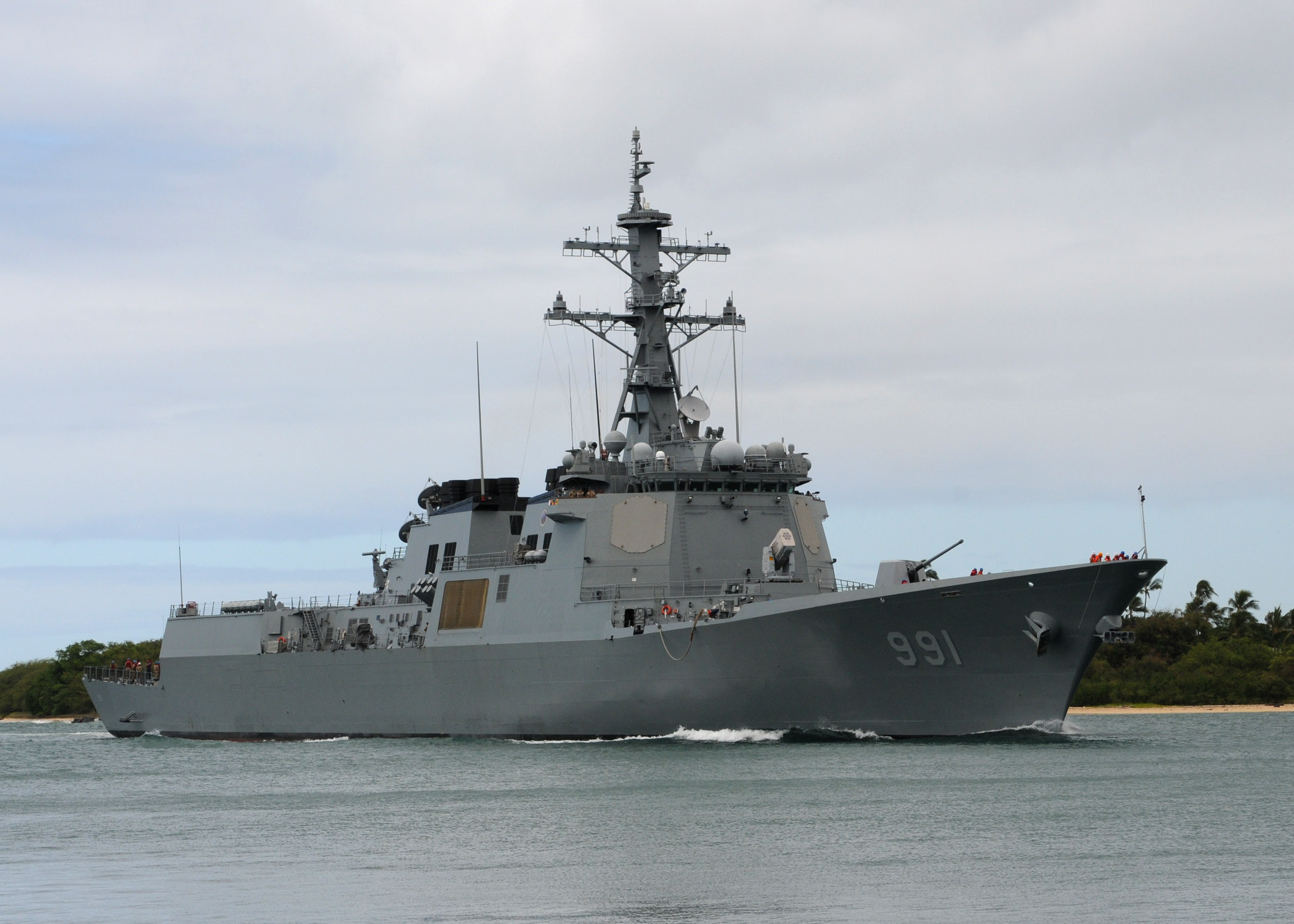
ROKS Sejong the Great arriving in Pearl Harbor during RIMPAC 2010.

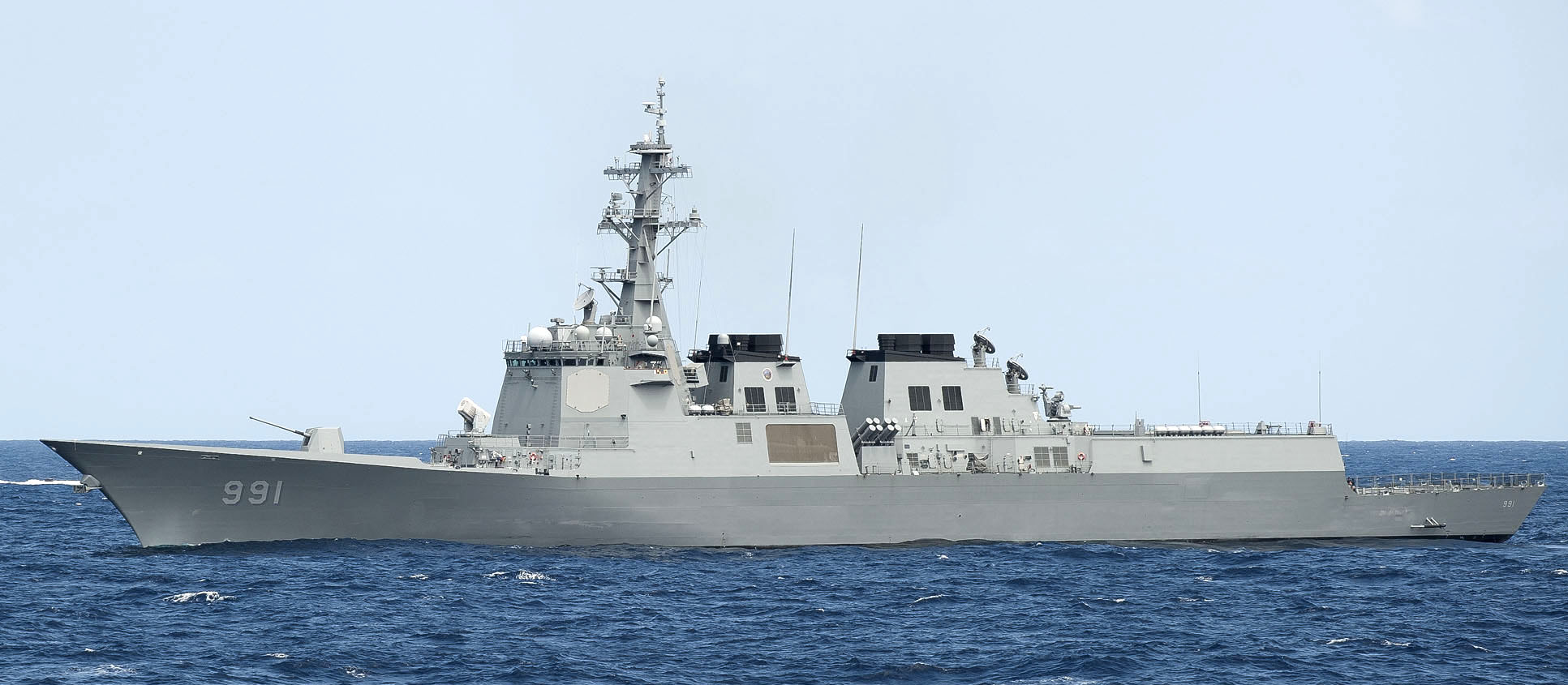
ROKS Sejong the Great during RIMPAC 2010.

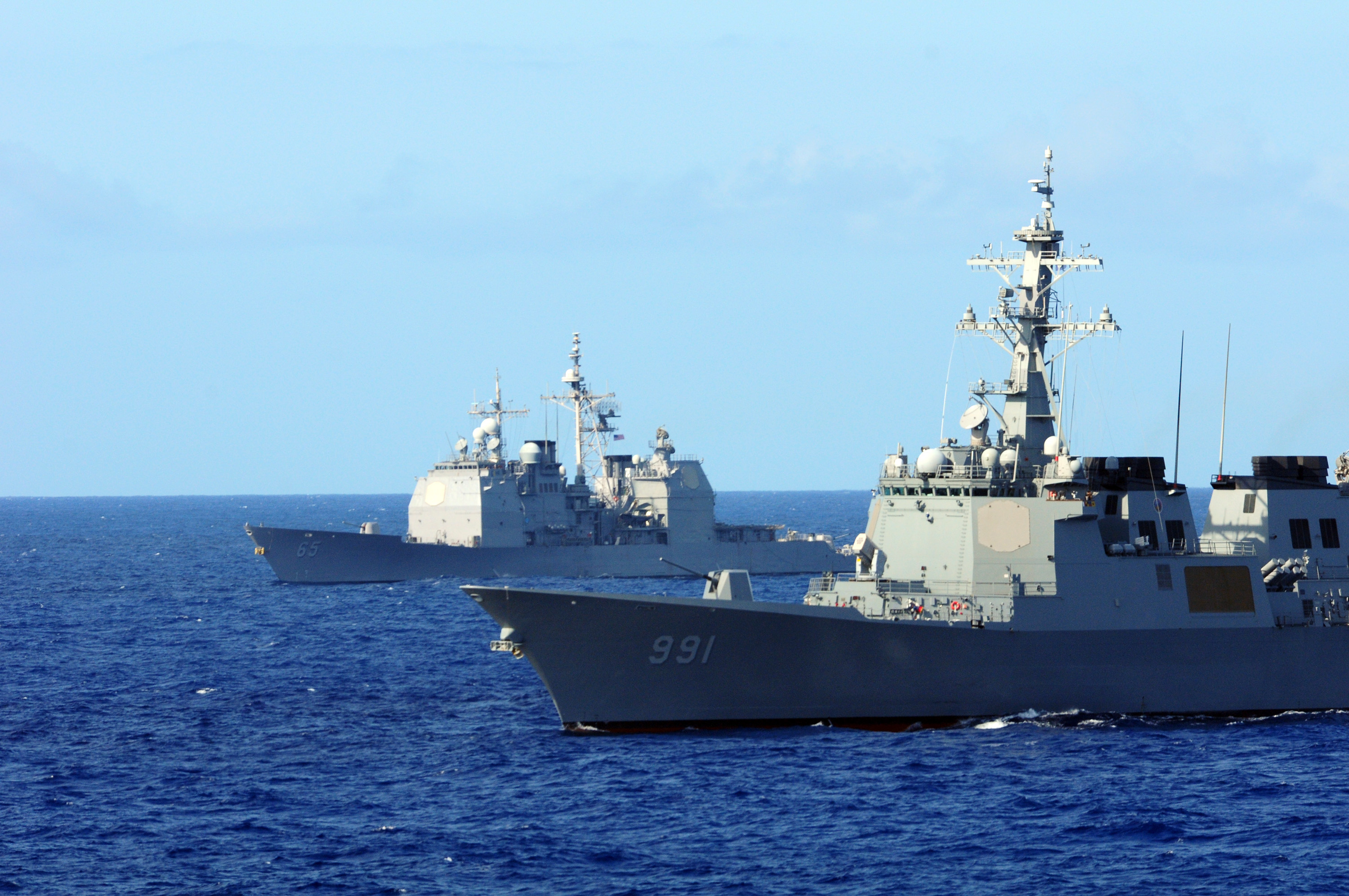
ROKS Sejong the Great alongside USS Chosin during RIMPAC 2010.

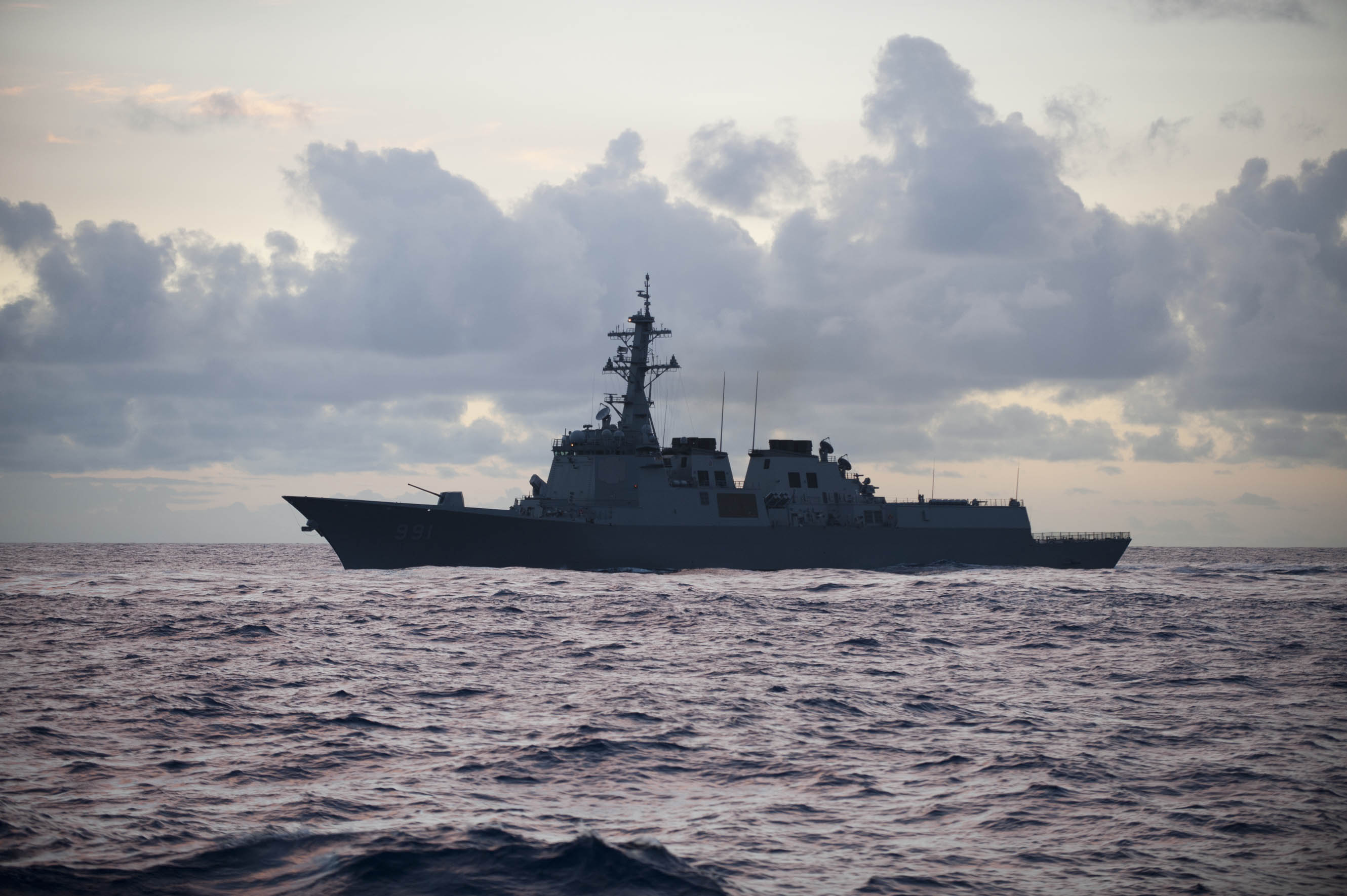
ROKS Sejong the Great during RIMPAC 2010.

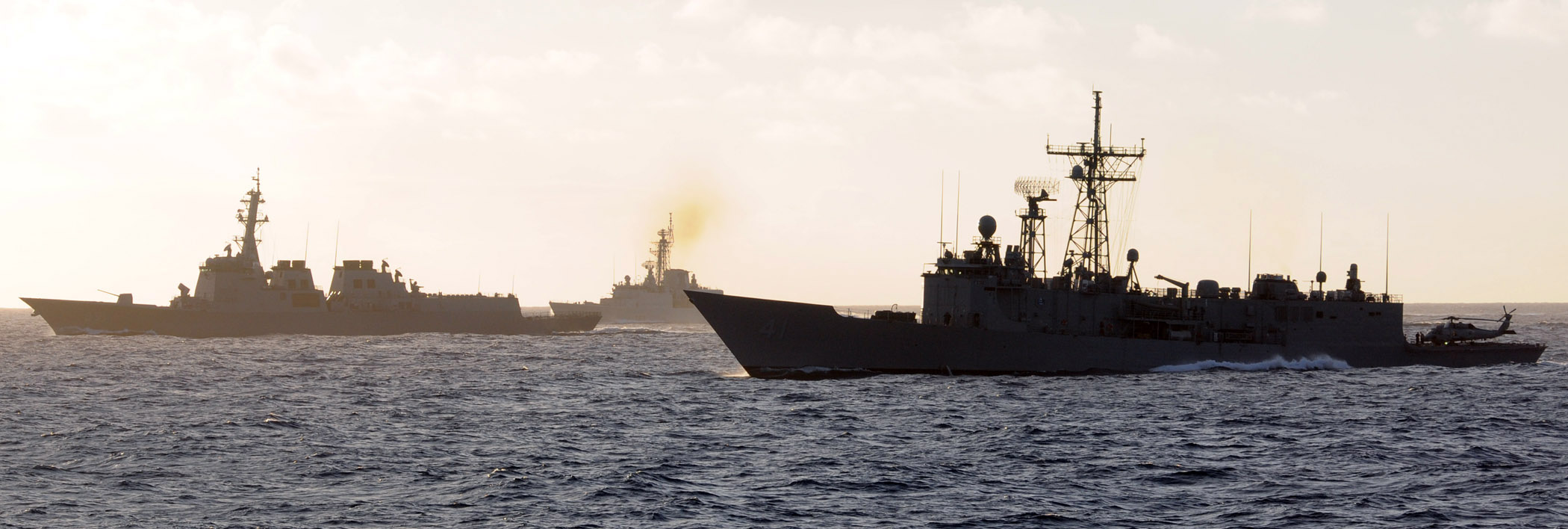
ROKS Sejong the Great alongside USS McClusky and HMCS Algonquin during RIMPAC 2010.
