= Sejong the Great-class destroyer =

Class of South Korean destroyers

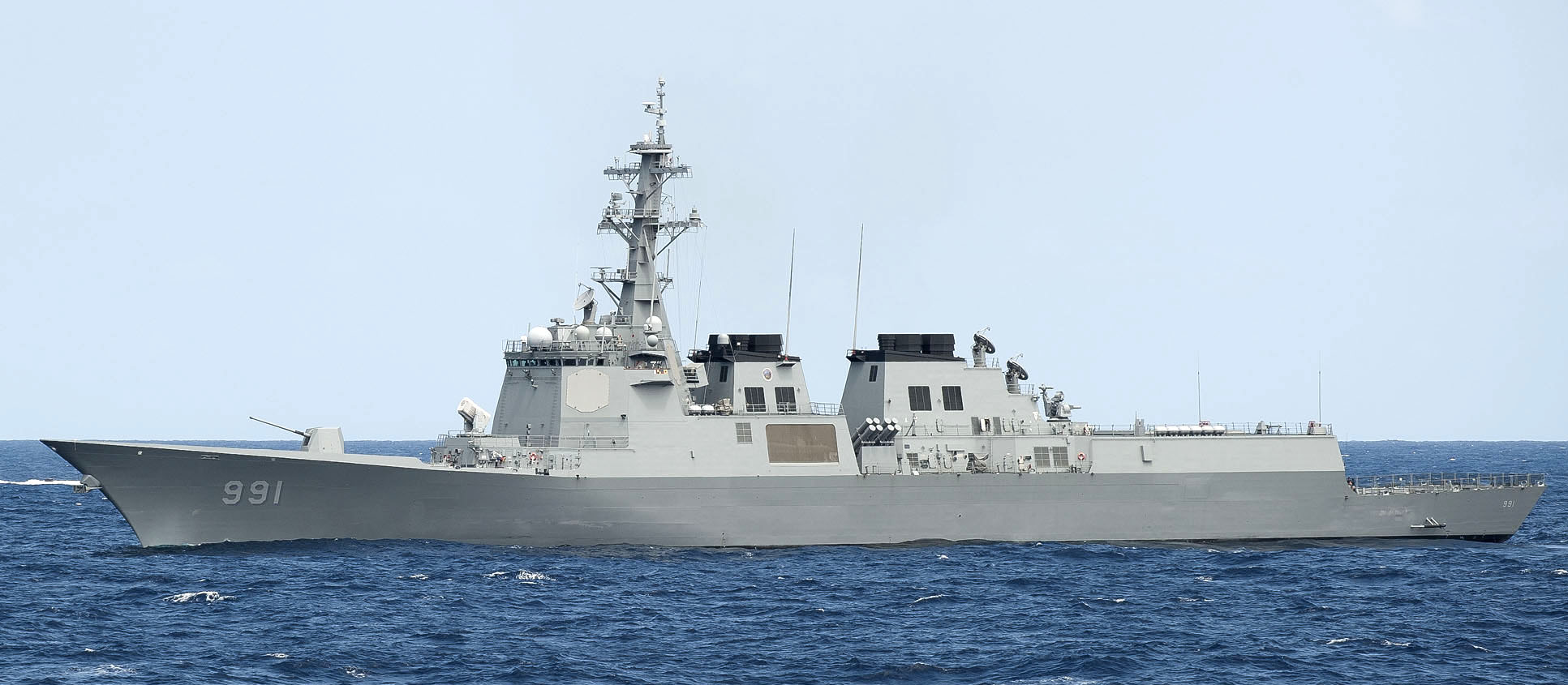
- ROKS Sejong the Great (DDG-991)

Class overview
- Builders: Hyundai Heavy Industries; Daewoo Shipbuilding & Marine Engineering
- Operators: Republic of Korea Navy
- Preceded by: Chungmugong Yi Sun-sin class
- Succeeded by: KDDX-class destroyer
- Cost: $923 million per ship
- Planned: 6
- Building: 2
- Completed: 4
- Active: 4

General characteristics
- Type: Large guided-missile destroyer
- Displacement: Batch I: 7,650 tons standard displacement; 10,000 tons full load; Batch II: 8,200 tons standard displacement; 12,000 tons full load
- Length: Batch I: 166 m (544 ft 7 in); Batch II: 170 m (557 ft 9 in)
- Beam: 21.4 m (70 ft 3 in)
- Draft: 6.25 m (20 ft 6 in)
- Propulsion: 4 × General Electric LM2500 COGAG; 2 × shafts; 100,000 shp (75,000 kW) produced power
- Speed: exceeds 30 knots (56 km/h; 35 mph)
- Range: 5,500 nmi (10,200 km; 6,300 mi)
- Endurance: 30 days
- Complement: 300
- Sensors & processing systems: AN/SPY-1D(V) multi-function radar; AN/SPG-62 fire control radar; DSQS-21BZ-M hull-mounted sonar; SQR-220K towed array sonar system; Sagem Infrared Search & Track (IRST) system
- Electronic warfare & decoys: LIG Nex1 SLQ-200K Sonata electronic warfare suite
- Armament: Batch I: 1 × 5-inch (127 mm)/L62 caliber Mk 45 Mod 4 naval gun; 1 × 30 mm Goalkeeper CIWS; 1 × RAM Block 1 CIWS; 16 × SSM-700K Haeseong anti-ship missile; 2 × triple torpedo tubes for: K745 Blue Shark torpedo; 1 × 48-cell, 1 × 32-cell (80 cells) Mk 41 VLS for: SM-2 Block IIIB/IV; 1 × 48-cell K-VLS for: K-ASROC Red Shark; Hyunmoo III land attack cruise missiles; K-SAAM short range air defence missiles; KM-SAM air defence missiles; Batch II: 1 × 5-inch (127 mm)/L62 caliber Mk 45 Mod 4; 2 × 20mm Block 1B Phalanx CIWS; 8 × SSM-700K Haeseong anti-ship missile; 2 × triple torpedo tubes for: K745 Blue Shark torpedo; 1 × 48-cell Mk 41 VLS for: SM-2 Block IIIB/IV; SM-3 NTW Block IB; SM-6 Block I; 1 × 16-cell K-VLS for: K-ASROC Red Shark; Hyunmoo III land attack cruise missiles; K-SAAM short range air defence missiles; KM-SAM air defence missiles; 1 × 24-cell K-VLS II for: L-SAM long range air defence missiles; Hyunmoo IV-2 ballistic missiles
- Aircraft carried: 2 × Super Lynx or SH-60 Seahawk
- Aviation facilities: Hangar and helipad

The Sejong the Great-class destroyers (Sejongdaewang-Geup Guchukam or Hangul: 세종대왕급 구축함, Hanja: 世宗大王級驅逐艦), also known as KDX-III, are large guided-missile destroyers of the Republic of Korea Navy (ROKN).

== Hull name ==
On 20 April 2007, South Korean Chief of Naval Operations announced that the lead ship of KDX-III class destroyers will be referred to as Sejong the Great. Sejong the Great (Hangul: 세종대왕) is the fourth king of the Joseon dynasty of Korea. He is credited with the creation of the indigenous Korean system of writing.

== Background ==
The Sejong the Great class is the third phase of the ROKN's Korean Destroyer eXperimental (KDX) program, a substantial shipbuilding program, which is geared toward enhancing ROKN's ability to successfully defend the maritime areas around South Korea from various modes of threats as well as becoming a blue-water navy.

At 8,500 tons standard displacement and 10,000 tons full load, the KDX-III Sejong the Great destroyers are the largest destroyers in the ROKN and larger than most destroyers in the navies of other countries. They are built slightly bulkier and heavier than Arleigh Burke-class destroyers or Atago-class destroyers to accommodate 32 more missiles. As such, some analysts believe that this class of ships is more appropriately termed a class of cruisers rather than destroyers. As of 2010, KDX-III Batch II ships were the largest to carry the Aegis combat system.

== Armaments ==
Sejong the Great-class destroyers' main gun is the 127 mm/L62 Mk 45 Mod 4 naval gun, an improved version of the same gun used on other warships from several other nations. Point-defense armaments include one 30 mm Goalkeeper CIWS and a RIM-116 Rolling Airframe Missile Block 1 21-round launcher, the first Aegis platform to carry RAM. Anti-aircraft armament consists of SM-2 Block IIIA and IIIB in 80 total Mk 41 VLS cells. Block IIIB has added infrared (IR) induction mode to Block IIIA, improving interception capability.

Anti-submarine warfare armaments consists of both K-ASROC Hong Sang-uh (Red Shark) anti-submarine rockets, which have the same form as the U.S. ASROC, and 32 K745 LW Cheong Sang-uh (Blue Shark) torpedoes. Anti-ship capability is provided by 16 SSM-700K Hae Sung (Sea Star) long-range anti-ship missiles, each with performance similar to the U.S. Harpoon. It is equipped on a navy ship that is built after the late KDX-II destroyers. Land-attack capability is provided by the Hyunmoo III cruise missile.

Missile batteries, Batch I

- Vertical Launching System: 128 total cells
  - Mk 41 VLS 48 cells (Fwd)
  - Mk 41 VLS 32 cells (Aft)
  - K-VLS 48 cells (Aft)
- Anti-ship missile launchers:
  - 16 (4 × quadruple) launchers, SSM-700K

Missile batteries, Batch II

- Vertical Launching System: 88 total cells
  - Mk 41 VLS 48 cells (Fwd)
  - K-VLS 16 cells (Aft)
  - K-VLS II 24 cells (Aft)
- Anti-ship missile launchers:
  - 8 (2 × quadruple) launchers, SSM-700K

== Capabilities ==
Batch I features the Aegis Combat System (Baseline 7 Phase 1) combined with AN/SPY-1D(V) multi-function radar antennae. This gives the destroyers the ability to track missiles launched from anywhere in North Korea. This capability was demonstrated by the tracking of a North Korean missile in April 2009.

The Sejong the Great-class destroyers are often compared to the Arleigh Burke and Atago classes because they utilize the AN/SPY-1D multi-function radar, and have similar propulsion and capabilities. One notable difference between the Sejong the Great-class ships and Arleigh Burkes is the number of VLS cells. Destroyers of the Sejong the Great class have a capacity of 128 missiles, as opposed to 96 on the Arleigh Burke class and the Japanese Atago-class destroyers. The Sejong the Great class is thus one of the most heavily armed ships in the world, with greater missile capacity than the Chinese People's Liberation Army Navy Type 055 destroyer (112 VLS cells). The Sejong the Great class is surpassed in VLS depth only by the Kirov-class battlecruiser with 352 missiles (entire missile load).

Another similarity to Arleigh Burke Flight IIA and Atago-class destroyers is the presence of full facilities for two helicopters, a feature missing from earlier Arleigh Burkes and Kongō-class destroyers.

=== BMD ===
In August 2016, press reports revealed that South Korea was considering adding the SM-3 interceptor to its Sejong the Great-class ships to enable them to perform ballistic missile defense in response to North Korean efforts to bolster offensive missile capabilities. This came months after the U.S. decision to deploy the THAAD missile interceptor system on mainland South Korea. The addition of SM-3s to the ships may require software and computer hardware upgrades. The following month, Aegis manufacturer Lockheed Martin confirmed the next three Sejong the Great vessels (Batch II) will be capable of performing "integrated air and missile defense" (IAMD) to supplement U.S. Army ground-based missile interceptors on the peninsula, likely being outfitted with the SM-3. While the first three destroyers are fitted with Aegis Baseline 7 based on older proprietary computers that can't carry out IAMD operations, the following three will be fitted with the Baseline 9 version of the Aegis Combat System that combines modern computing architecture to allow the AN/SPY-1D(V) radar to perform air warfare and BMD missions at the same time.

At MADEX 2019, Lockheed Martin reported that the new ships will get Aegis Baseline 9.C2 with software variant "KII" and BMD baseline 5, which allows the use of SM-3 Block IB. The multifunction radar remains AN/SPY-1D(V). LIG Nex1's SPS-560K 3D radar will be used to guide K-SAAM.

== Ships in class ==
Name	Pennant number	Builder	Launched	Commissioned	Status
Batch I
ROKS Sejong the Great (Korean: 세종대왕함)	DDG-991	Hyundai Heavy Industries	25 May 2007	22 December 2008	Active
ROKS Yulgok Yi I (Korean: 율곡이이함)	DDG-992	Daewoo Shipbuilding & Marine Engineering	14 November 2008	31 August 2010	Active
ROKS Seoae Ryu Seong-ryong (Korean: 서애류성룡함)	DDG-993	Hyundai Heavy Industries	24 March 2011	30 August 2012	Active
Batch II
ROKS Jeongjo the Great (Korean: 정조대왕함)	DDG-995	Hyundai Heavy Industries	28 July 2022	27 November 2024	Active
ROKS Dasan Jeong Yak-yong (Korean: 다산정약용함)	DDG-996	Hyundai Heavy Industries	17 September 2025	2026	Launched
ROKS Daeho Kim Jong-seo (Korean: 대호김종서함)	DDG-997	Hyundai Heavy Industries	30 September 2026	2027	Launched

On 10 October 2019, HHI signed a deal to build the first of three 170m long, KDX-III Batch II Aegis destroyers for the ROKN. The Sejong the Great class is KDX-III Batch-I, and ROKN is planning 3 ships of KDX-III Batch-II. Under the deal, HHI will deliver the first ship by November 2024.

== See also ==
- List of destroyer classes in service

Equivalent destroyers of the same era

- Atago class
- Type 45
- Type 055 destroyer
- Horizon class
