= ROKS Yulgok Yi I =

Sejong the Great-class destroyer

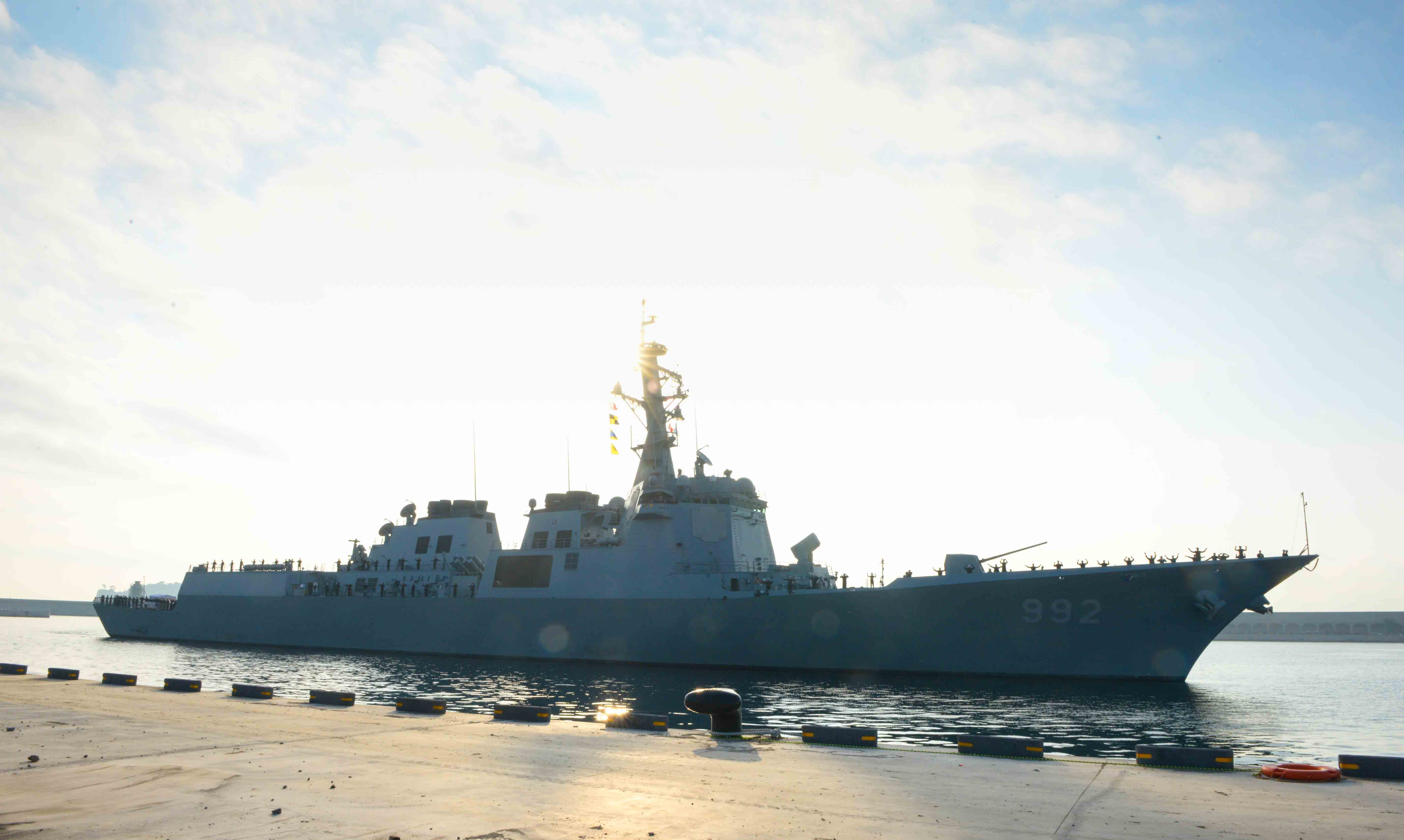
- ROKS Yulgok Yi I on 22 December 2015

South Korea
- Name: Yulgok Yi I; (율곡이이/栗谷李珥)
- Namesake: Yulgok Yi I
- Builder: DSME
- Launched: 14 November 2008
- Commissioned: 31 August 2010
- Identification: Pennant number: DDG-992
- Status: Active

General characteristics
- Class & type: Sejong the Great-class destroyer
- Displacement: 8,500 tons standard displacement; 10,000 tons full load
- Length: 166 m (544 ft 7 in)
- Beam: 21.4 m (70 ft 3 in)
- Draft: 6.25 m (20 ft 6 in)
- Propulsion: 4 × General Electric LM2500 COGAG; 2 × shafts; 100,000 shp (75 MW) produced power
- Speed: exceeds 30 knots (56 km/h; 35 mph)
- Range: 5,500 nautical miles (10,200 km; 6,300 mi)
- Endurance: 30 days
- Complement: 300 crew
- Sensors & processing systems: AN/SPY-1D(V) multi-function radar; AN/SPG-62 fire control radar; DSQS-21BZ-M hull mounted sonar; SQR-220K towed array sonar system; Sagem Infrared Search & Track (IRST) system
- Electronic warfare & decoys: LIG Nex1 SLQ-200K Sonata electronic warfare suite
- Armament: 1 × 5 inch (127 mm)/L62 caliber Mk 45 Mod 4 naval gun; 1 × 30 mm Goalkeeper CIWS; 1 × RAM Block 1 CIWS; 16 × SSM-700K Haeseong Anti-ship Missiles; 2 × triple torpedo tubes for K745 Blue Shark torpedo; 80-cell Mk 41 VLS for SM-2 Block IIIB/IV; 48-cell K-VLS for: K-ASROC Red Shark; Hyunmoo III land attack cruise missiles
- Aircraft carried: 2 × Super Lynx or SH-60 Seahawk
- Aviation facilities: Hangar and helipad

ROKS Yulgok Yi I (DDG-992) is the second ship of the Sejong the Great-class destroyers that was built for the Republic of Korea Navy. She was designed around the Aegis Combat System and was named after philosopher and scholar of the Joseon Dynasty, Yulgok Yi I.

== Background ==
The ship features the Aegis Combat System (Baseline 7 Phase 1) combined with AN/SPY-1D multi-function radar antennae.

The Sejong the Great class is the third phase of the South Korean navy's Korean Destroyer eXperimental (KDX) program, a substantial shipbuilding program, which is geared toward enhancing ROKN's ability to successfully defend the maritime areas around South Korea from various modes of threats as well as becoming a blue-water navy.

At 8,500 tons standard displacement and 10,000 tons full load, the KDX-III Sejong the Great destroyers are by far the largest destroyers in the South Korean Navy, and indeed are larger than most destroyers in the navies of other countries. and built slightly bulkier and heavier than Arleigh Burke-class destroyers or Atago-class destroyers to accommodate 32 more missiles. As such, some analysts believe that this class of ships is more appropriately termed a class of cruisers rather than destroyers.

== Construction and career ==
ROKS Yulgok Yi I was launched on 14 November 2008 by Daewoo Shipbuilding & Marine Engineering. She was commissioned into Republic of Korea Navy service on 31 August 2010.

=== RIMPAC Exercise ===
Republic of Korea Navy has actively participated in the recent iterations of the Rim of the Pacific Exercise or RIMPAC, which is held biennially from Honolulu, Hawaii. The exercises seeks to enhance interoperability among Pacific Rim armed forces, as a means of promoting stability in the region to the benefit of all participating nations. ROKS Yulgok Yi I has participated in the exercises on 2012, 2018 and 2024.
