= KDDX-class destroyer =

Stealthy destroyer class under development by Hyundai Heavy Industries for ROK Navy,

Class overview
- Name: KDDX
- Builders: Hanwha Ocean
- Operators: Republic of Korea Navy
- Preceded by: Chungmugong Yi Sun-sin class
- Planned: 6

General characteristics
- Type: Destroyer / frigate
- Displacement: 6,000 to 7,000 t (5,900 to 6,900 long tons)
- Length: 155 m (508 ft 6 in)
- Beam: 18 to 18.8 m (59 ft 1 in to 61 ft 8 in)
- Draft: 9.5 m (31 ft 2 in)
- Propulsion: 2 × GE LM2500+G4 35.32 MW (47,360 hp)
- Sensors & processing systems: Combat systems; Indigenous combat management system; I-MAST, with S-band and X-band phased-array multifunction radar
- Armament: VLS: KVLS-I; KVLS-II; Missiles: K-SAAM (anti-air); KSAM-II (anti-air); Hyunmoo-3C (LACM); SSM-700K

The Korean Next-Generation Destroyer (KDDX) is a next generation stealth guided-missile destroyer under development by Hyundai Heavy Industries for ROK Navy, to be launched after 2025. Displacement of the class is set to be about 8,000 tons, length 155 meters, breadth 18.8 meters and draft 9.5 meters. Will feature KVLS to launch Hyunmoo-3C land-attack cruise missiles and SSM-700K anti-ship missiles. At 8000 tons displacement, it will be lighter than Sejong the Great-class destroyers, but with more advanced sensors and stealth characteristics and lower operating costs. The ships will have advanced missile defense. The size of this new destroyer would be between that of the currently operating 4,200-ton KDX-II and the Aegis Destroyer KDX-III, and would be assigned to a naval task force. The total cost of developing and producing the six vessels is expected to top $6.2 billion.

== History ==
The project was unveiled back in 2009 next-generation during the 2009 Navy Audit and was supposed to be equipped with SM-2 surface-to-air missiles and SPY-based radars that would slot in between the Chungmugong Yi Sun-sin-class destroyer (KDX-II) and Sejong the Great-class destroyer (KDX-III).

In 2012, it was again confirmed that the Republic of Korea Navy would procure six next-generation destroyers and the project being renamed from KDX-IIA to KDDX in the Basic Plans for Defense Reform (2012–2030) and that it would be built after 2020. But by 2013, it was decided to procure three more destroyers under a new subclass of the Sejong the Great-class destroyer named KDX-III Batch II (Jeongjo the Great) and the funding and priority allotted for the KDDX was shifted to the new batch of AEGIS-equipped destroyers.

In 2018, the 118th Defense Program Promotion Committee approved the Basic Strategy for the Promotion of the Korean Next Destroyer (KDDX) Project and by 2019, work began on its initial basic design and its development.

During MADEX 2019, both HD Hyundai Heavy Industries and Hanwha Ocean (then known as Daewoo Shipbuilding & Marine Engineering) displayed their proposal for the KDDX program.

On 1 September 2026, GE Aerospace announced it will supply 12 GE LM2500+G4 marine gas turbine engines for six destroyers. Hanwha Aerospace will manufacture engine components, assemble engines, test them and provide local support activities.

On 17 September 2026, Leonardo DRS announced it has signed a contract with Doosan Enerbility to provide the electric propulsion system for the KDDX class. Leonardo will supply 100-Series permanent-magnet propulsion motors and compact variable-frequency drives (VFDs). These together form the integrated electric power and propulsion system. It also indicates the KDDX class is being designed to support intensive naval systems which could include directed-energy systems. Ships could also support charging of UAVs, launching drone swarms due to its designed electrical capacity

Conceptual models displayed at MADEX 2021 (International Maritime Defense Industry Exhibition)

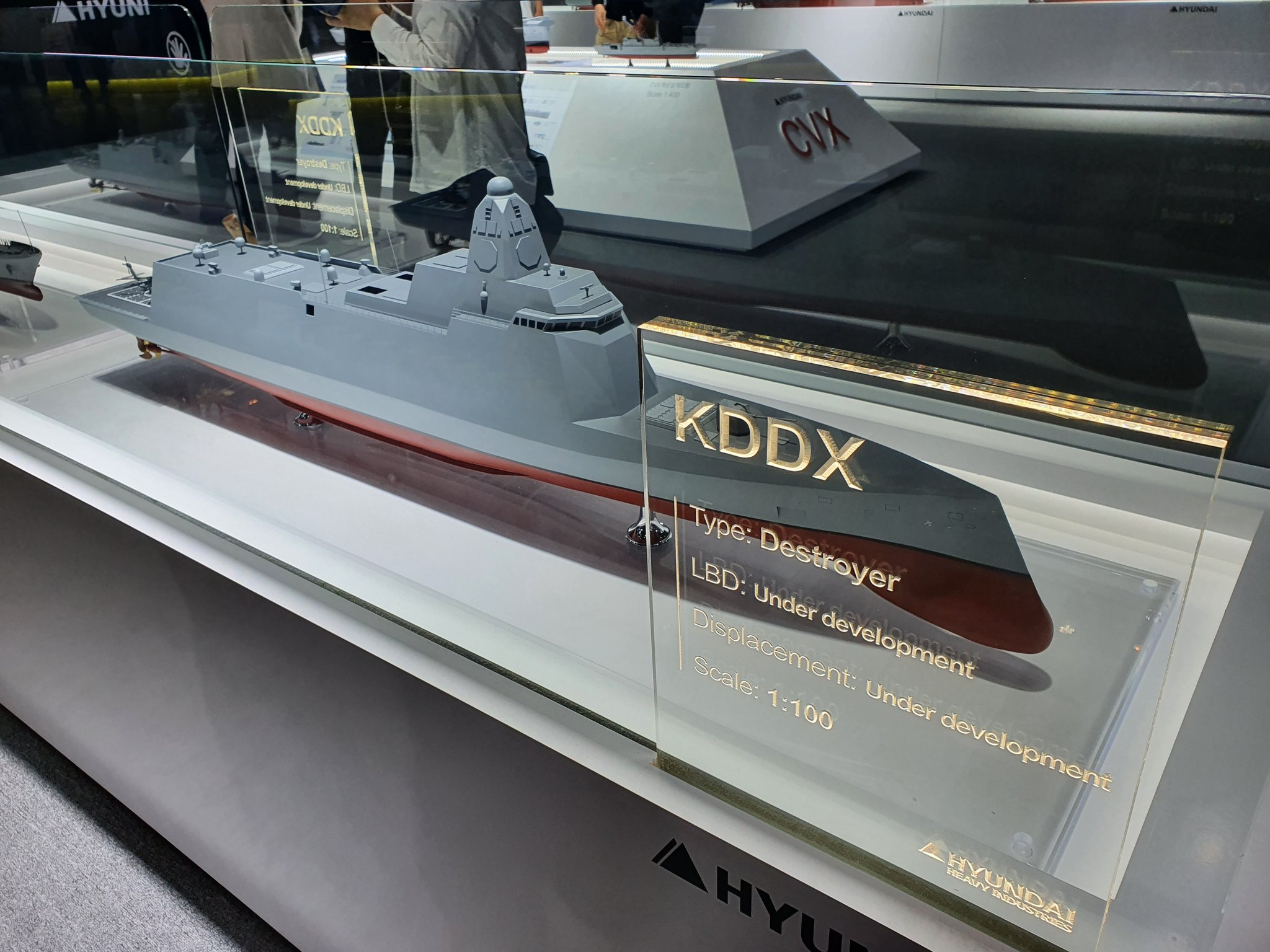
Proposal by Hyundai Heavy Industries

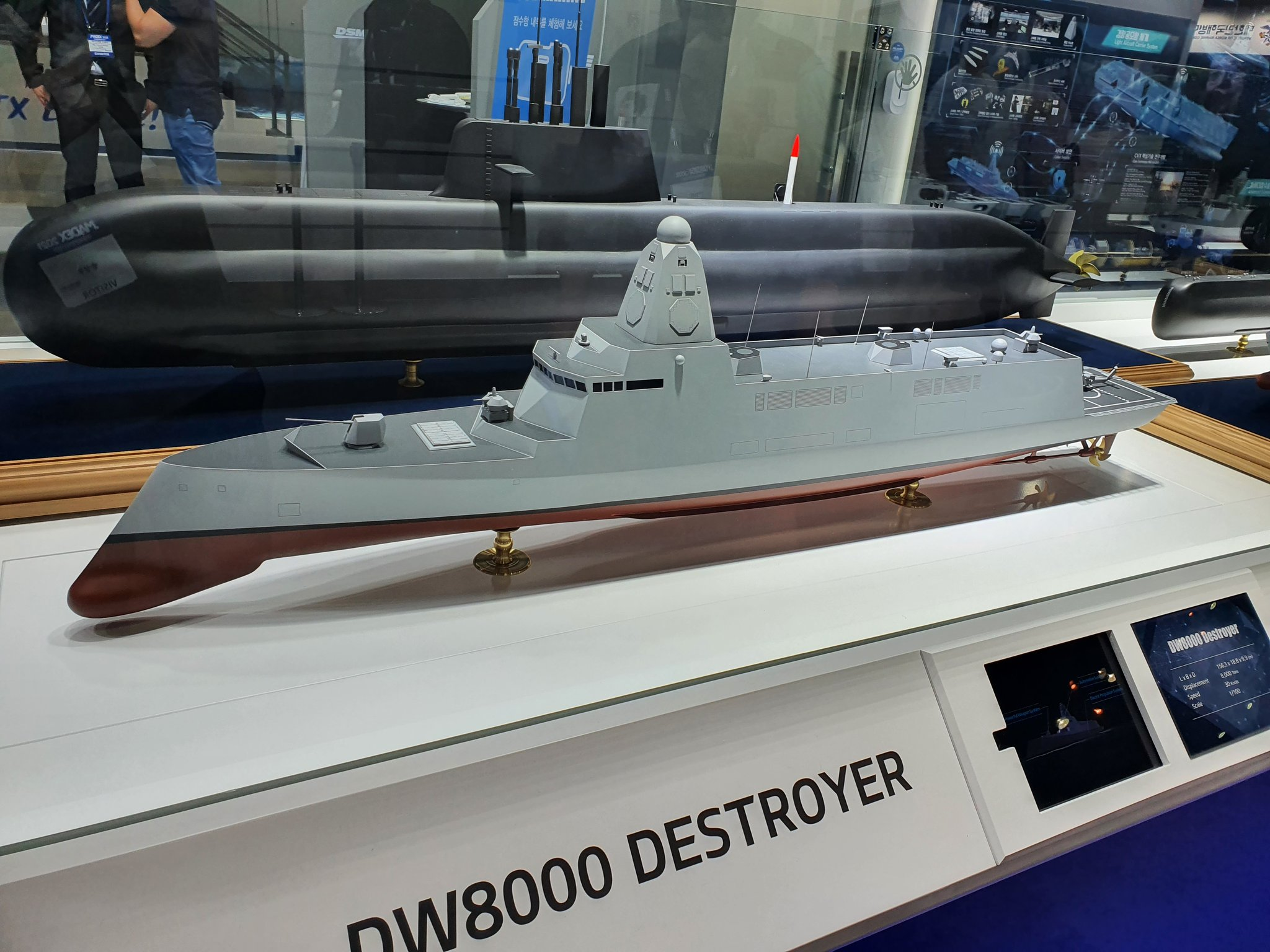
Proposal by Daewoo Shipbuilding & Marine Engineering

== See also ==
- Korean Destroyer eXperimental
- Gwanggaeto the Great-class destroyer
- Chungmugong Yi Sun-sin-class destroyer
