= Korean Destroyer eXperimental =

Shipbuilding program by the South Korean Navy

KDX (Korean Destroyer eXperimental) is a substantial shipbuilding program embarked on by the Republic of Korea Navy.

It is a three-phased program consisting of three individual classes of ships:

- KDX-I (3,800 tons),
- KDX-II (5,500 tons),
  - KDX-IIA, planned derivative of KDX-II with Aegis combat system and stealth technology (5,500 ~ 7,500 tons)
- Aegis-equipped KDX-III (10,000 tons).

== Gwanggaeto the Great class destroyer (KDX-I) ==
Name	Number	Builder	Launched	Commissioned	Decommissioned	Status
Gwanggaeto the Great	DDH-971	Daewoo Heavy Industries	28 October 1996	July 24 1998		Active
Eulji Mundeok	DDH-972	Daewoo Heavy Industries	16 October 1997	30 August 1999		Active
Yang Manchun	DDH-973	Daewoo Heavy Industries	30 September 1998	29 June 2000		Active

== Chungmugong Yi Sun-shin class destroyer (KDX-II) ==
Name	Number	Builder	Launched	Commissioned	Decommissioned	Status
Chungmugong Yi Sun-sin	DDH-975	Daewoo Shipbuilding & Marine Engineering	15 May 2002	30 November 2003		Active
Munmu the Great	DDH-976	Hyundai Heavy Industries	11 April 2003	30 September 2004		Active
Dae Jo-yeong	DDH-977	Daewoo Shipbuilding & Marine Engineering	12 November 2003	30 June 2005		Active
Wang Geon	DDH-978	Hyundai Heavy Industries	4 May 2005	10 November 2006		Active
Gang Gam-chan	DDH-979	Daewoo Shipbuilding & Marine Engineering	16 March 2006	1 October 2007		Active
Choe Yeong	DDH-981	Hyundai Heavy Industries	20 October 2006	4 September 2008		Active

== Sejong the Great class destroyer (KDX-III) ==
Name	Number	Builder	Launched	Commissioned	Decommissioned	Status
Batch I
Sejong the Great	DDG-991	Hyundai Heavy Industries	25 May 2007	22 December 2008		Active
Yulgok Yi I	DDG-992	Daewoo Shipbuilding & Marine Engineering	14 November 2008	31 August 2010		Active
Seoae Yu Seong-ryong	DDG-993	Hyundai Heavy Industries	24 March 2011	30 August 2012		Active
Batch II
Jeongjo the Great	DDG-995	Hyundai Heavy Industries	28 July 2022	27 November 2024		Launched
Dasan Jeong Yak-yong	DDG-996	Hyundai Heavy Industries	17 September 2025			Launched
TBA	TBA	TBA				Planned
