= HD Hyundai Heavy Industries =

South Korean shipbuilding and equipment company

Coordinates: 35°31.00′N 129°26.49′E

HD Hyundai Heavy Industries Co., Ltd.

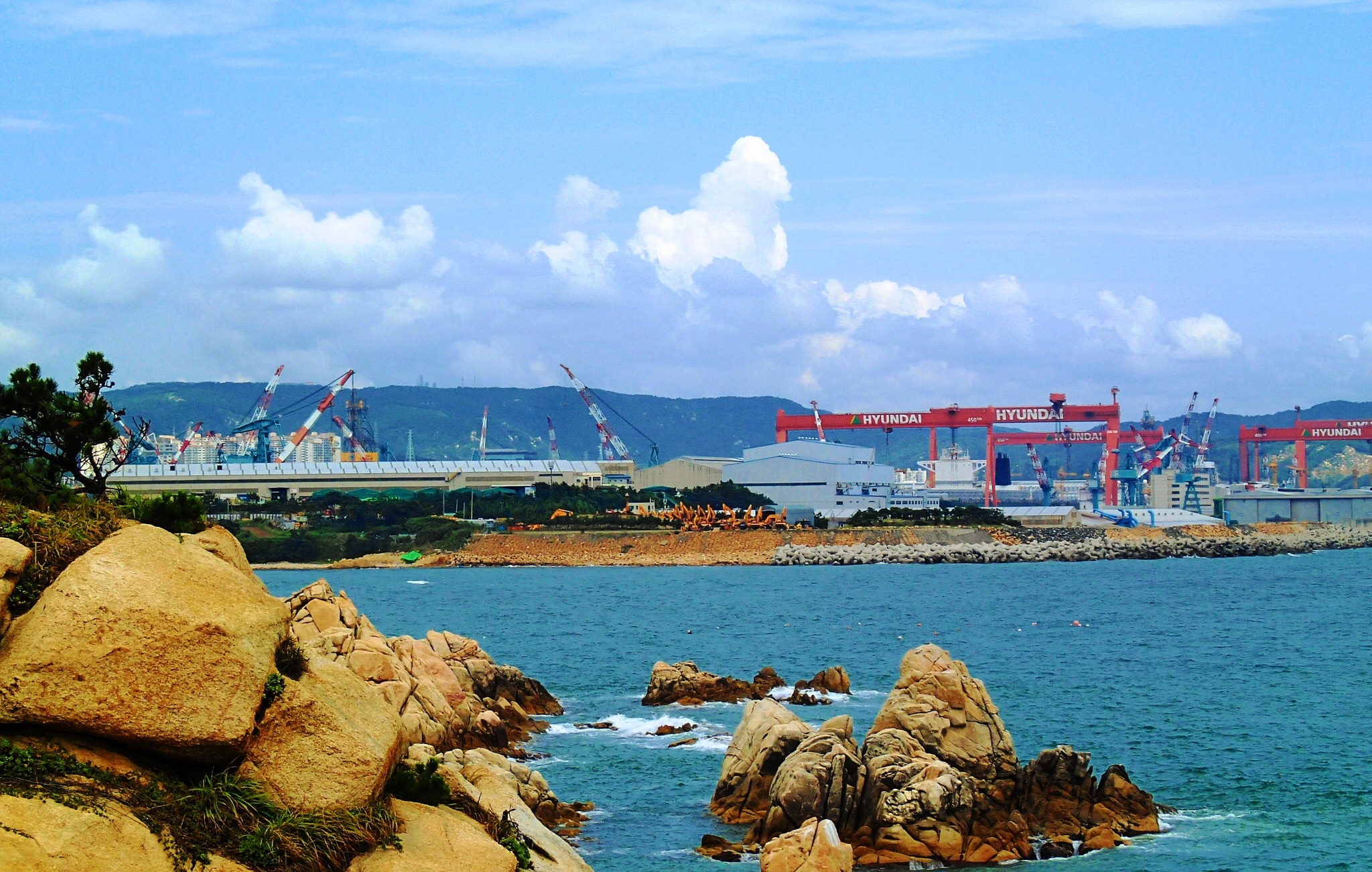
- HHI shipyard and cranes in Ulsan
- Native name: 에이치디현대중공업 주식회사
- Formerly: Hyundai Heavy Industries (1978–2022) Hyundai Mipo Dockyard (1975–2025)
- Type: Public
- Traded as: KRX: 329180
- Industry: Defense; Machine; Shipbuilding
- Founded: 1972; 54 years ago
- Founder: Chung Ju-yung
- Headquarters: Ulsan, South Korea
- Area served: Worldwide
- Key people: Chung Mong-joon (chairman)
- Revenue: ▲ ₩14.4865 trillion (2024)
- Operating income: ▲ ₩705.2 billion (2024)
- Net income: ▲ ₩621.5 billion (2024)
- Total assets: ▲ ₩19.3909 trillion (2024)
- Total equity: ▲ ₩5.7044 trillion (2024)
- Number of employees: 15,000 (2025)
- Parent: HD Korea Shipbuilding & Offshore Engineering
- Website: www.hhi.co.kr/en/main

HD Hyundai Heavy Industries Co., Ltd. (HHI; Korean: 에이치디현대중공업 주식회사; RR: Eichidi Hyeondae Junggongeop Jusik Hoesa) is the world's largest shipbuilding company and a major heavy equipment manufacturer. Its headquarters are in Ulsan, South Korea. It is one of the "Big Three" shipbuilders of South Korea, along with Hanwha and Samsung.

== History ==
=== Foundation ===
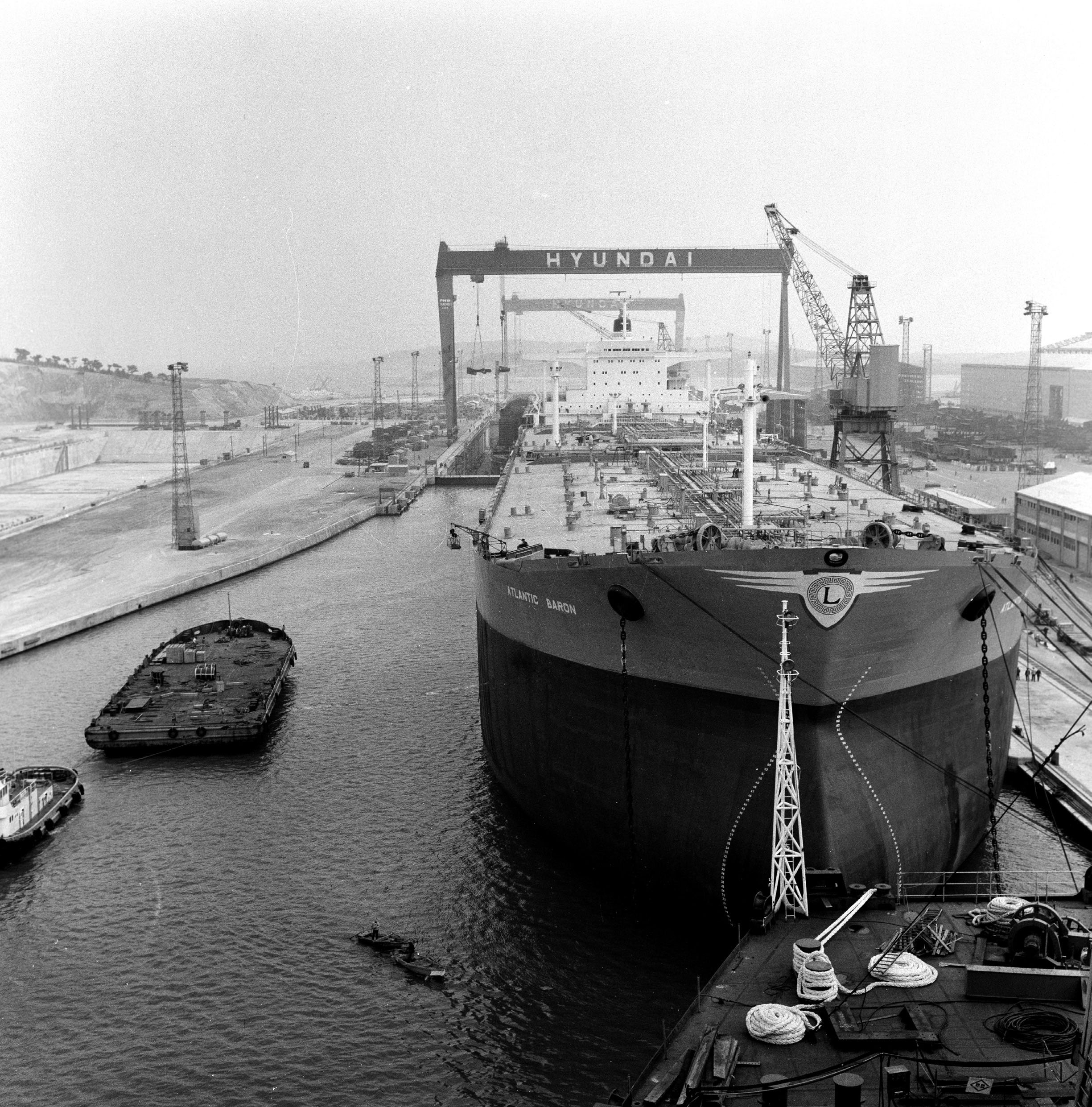
Atlantic Baron under construction in the Ulsan shipyard

Hyundai Shipbuilding & Heavy Industries (Korean: 현대조선중공업) was established in 1972 by Chung Ju-yung, founder of the Hyundai Group. The early establishment of the company was based on the South Korean government's strong support and Chung's ability to convince partners and clients. The government had a motive to develop the country's industry, moving beyond light manufacturing exports. The government's support included guarantees for foreign loans and investment in the construction of industrial complexes.

In the meantime, Chung played a large role in securing technological assistance and convincing lenders. Chung met Charles Longbottom of A&P Appledore, a British ship consulting firm, and secured a recommendation letter to obtain a USD 43 million loan from Barclays. Afterwards, Chung had to secure an actual ship order to obtain a loan approval from Britain's Export Credit Guarantee Department. Chung then successfully won the first order from the Greek shipping magnate George Livanos in 1971. The first order was two Very Large Crude Carriers (VLCCs), each with a capacity of 259,000 deadweight tons (DWT).

The initial development of the company was managed by Hyundai Construction, a Hyundai Group subsidiary, which also constructed a shipyard in Ulsan. Hyundai Construction established Hyundai Shipbuilding & Heavy Industries (HSHI) in 1972.

After two years, in 1974, HSHI delivered its first ship, Atlantic Baron, to Livanos. HSHI became the world's largest shipbuilding company in 1983.

=== Separation and Restructuring ===
In the early 2000s, a succession battle occurred among the sons of the Hyundai group founder, Chung Ju-yung. Although the primary feud was between the second son, Chung Mong-koo, and the fifth son, Chung Mong-hun, the sixth son, Chung Mong-joon, separated himself from the group, taking its heavy industries business arm.

In 2002, the company was spun off from the Hyundai Group and formed the Hyundai Heavy Industries Group. In the same year, HHI acquired Samho Heavy Industries from Halla Group, subsequently renaming it Hyundai Samho Heavy Industries. In 2016, HHI was split into four companies as part of its restructuring plan submitted to its creditors to cope with heavy losses in the business. The restructuring resulted in HHI retaining shipbuilding, offshore, and industrial plants as its core business, with the electric systems, construction equipment, and robot divisions being spun off into separate entities.

In 2019, HHI signed a deal with the Korea Development Bank to acquire Daewoo Shipbuilding & Marine Engineering (DSME), one of the world's largest shipbuilding companies and HHI's biggest competitor. For this acquisition, HHI launched Korea Shipbuilding & Offshore Engineering (KSOE), an intermediate holding company. KSOE became HHI's surviving entity, while the shipbuilding business itself was spun off into a new entity. The deal required antitrust approval from various countries, including China, the European Union, Japan, Kazakhstan, Singapore, and South Korea. Although KSOE successfully obtained approval from China, Kazakhstan, and Singapore, the deal ultimately collapsed after receiving a veto from the EU. KSOE remains the intermediate holding company today, overseeing HHI, HD Hyundai Mipo, and HD Hyundai Samho.

In late 2025, HD Hyundai Heavy Industries (HHI) merged with HD Hyundai Mipo (HMD) to create a unified entity aimed at solidifying its position as the world's top shipbuilder. The merger, approved in August 2025 and completed by December 2025, makes HHI the surviving company, combining HMD's mid-sized vessel expertise with HHI's large ship production.

== Businesses ==
HHI produces a wide array of vessels, including crude oil carriers, LNG carriers, and container ships. Building on this expertise, the company has successfully evolved into a key producer of naval vessels.

On 11 July 2024, Hyundai Heavy Industries became the first Korean shipbuilder to sign a master ship repair agreement (MSRA) with Naval Supply Systems Command (NAVSUP), qualifying to participate in the U.S. Navy's MRO business. The company has a partnership with Capital Product Partners to create four specialized ships with equipment for ocean-based carbon capture and storage to be delivered in 2025 and 2026 and at a cost of $300 million.

The company built the launch pad system for South Korea's rocket Naro-1 (KSLV-I) in 2013. It later manufactured the Nuri (KSLV-II) launch pad.

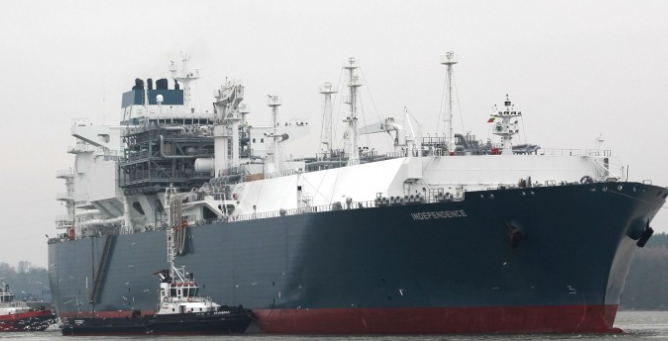
A HHI LNG carrier

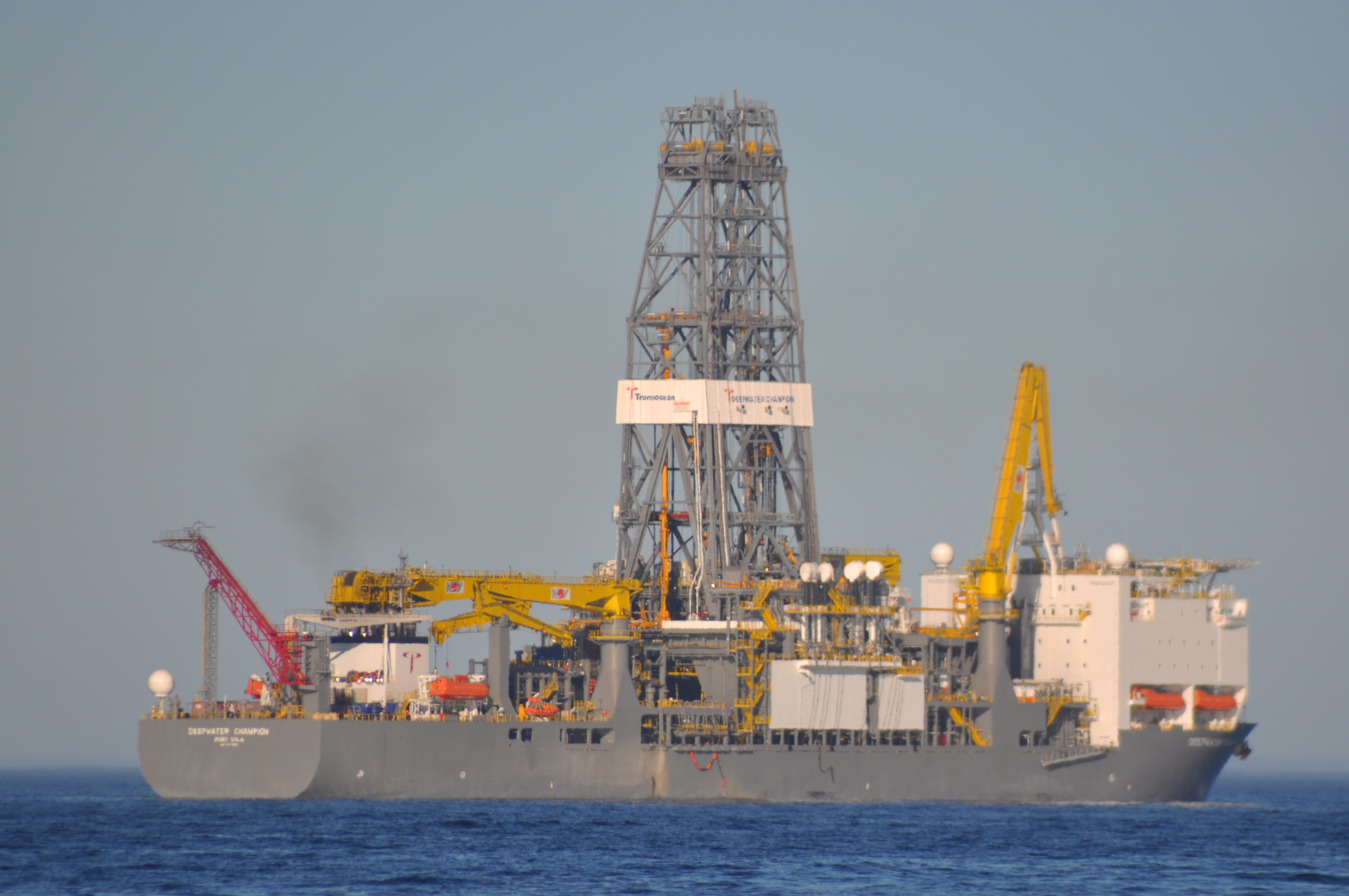
A HHI drillship

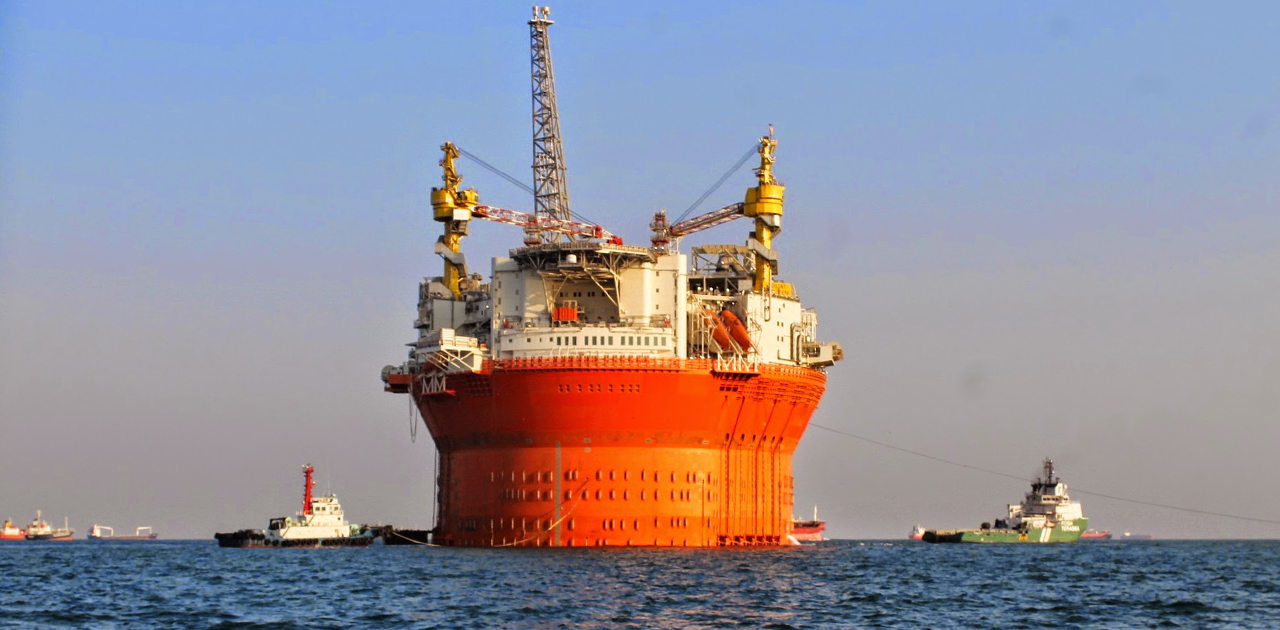
A HHI FPSO

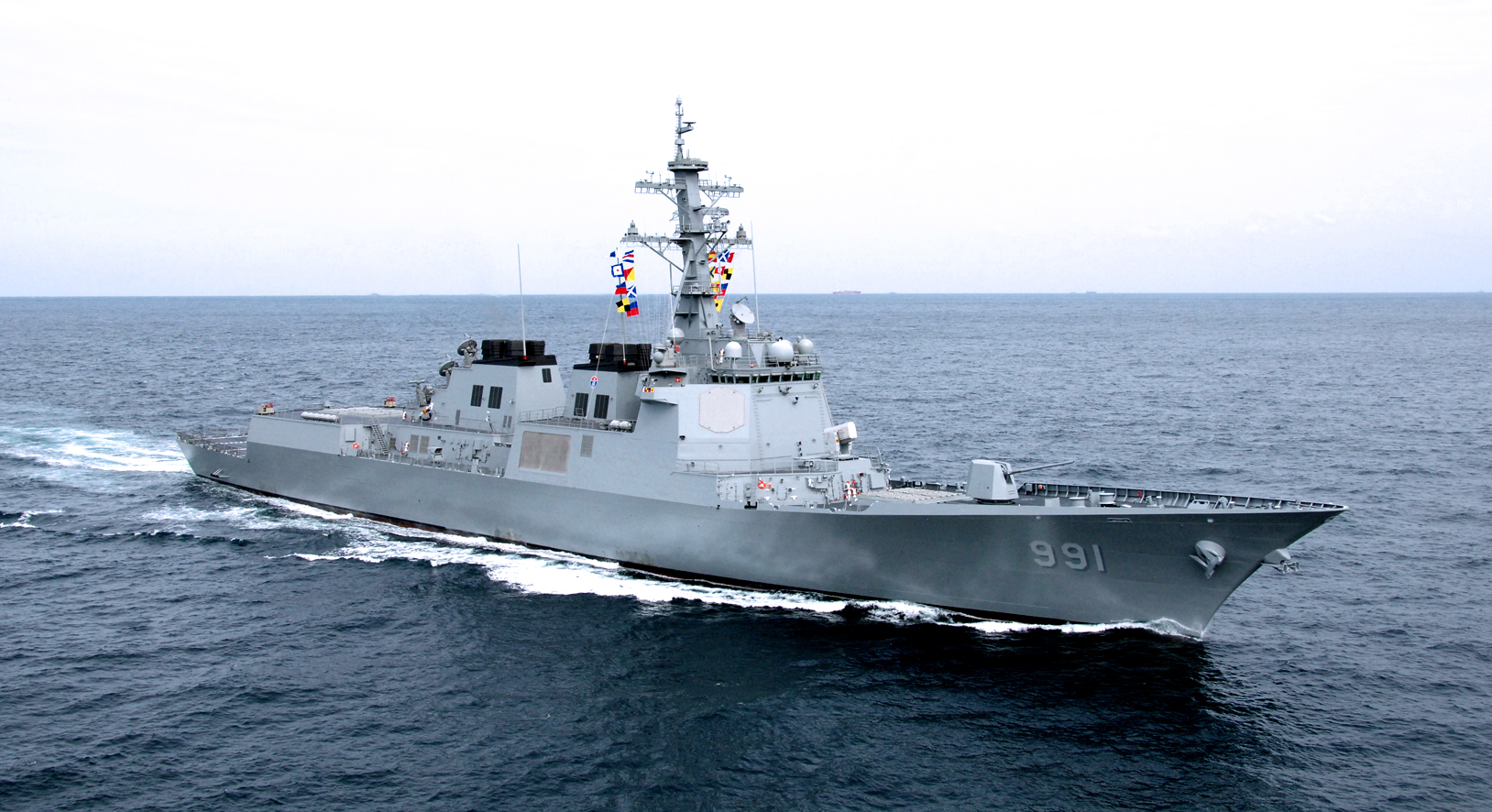
A HHI naval vessel, ROKS Sejong the Great

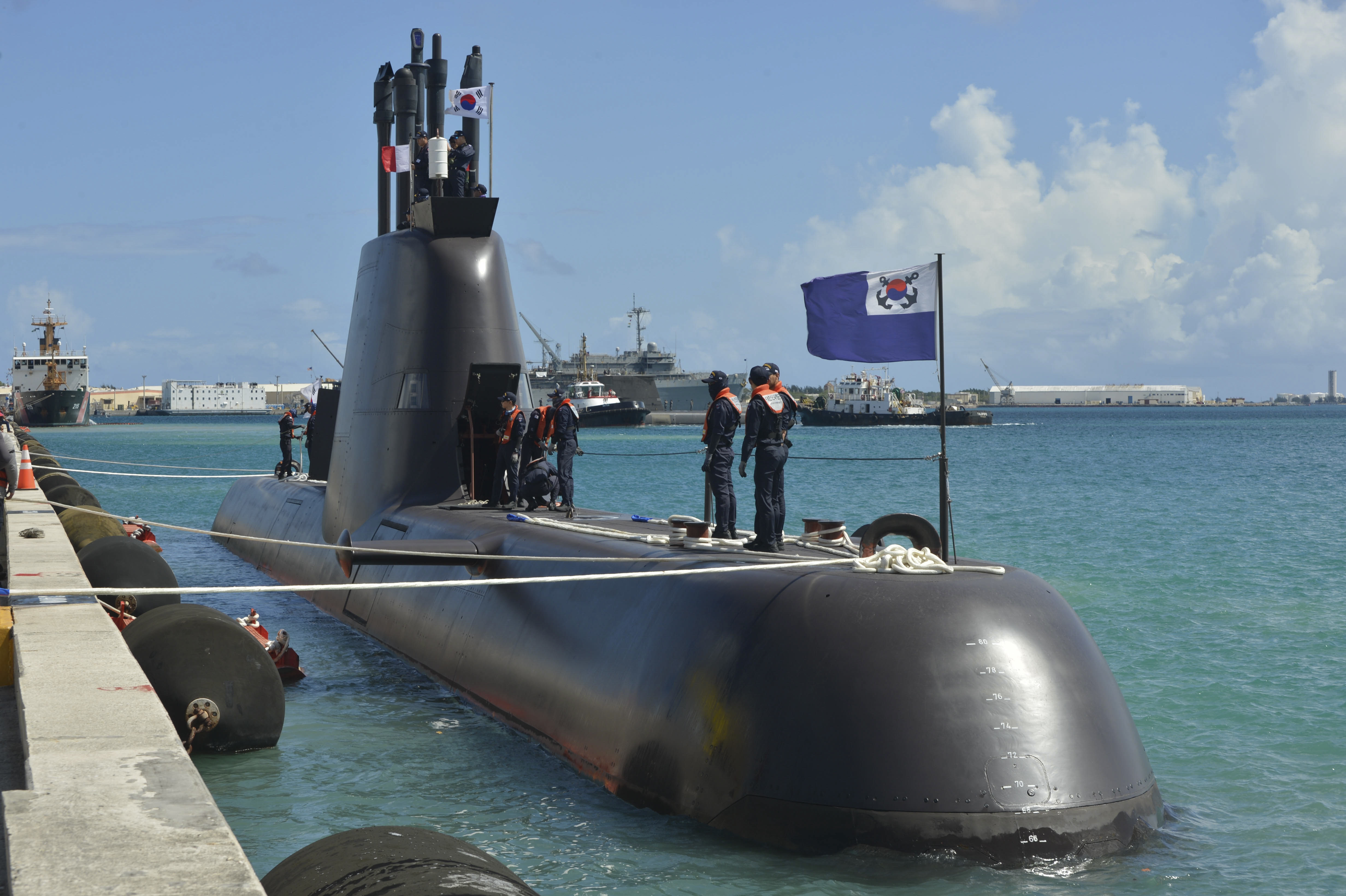
A HHI submarine

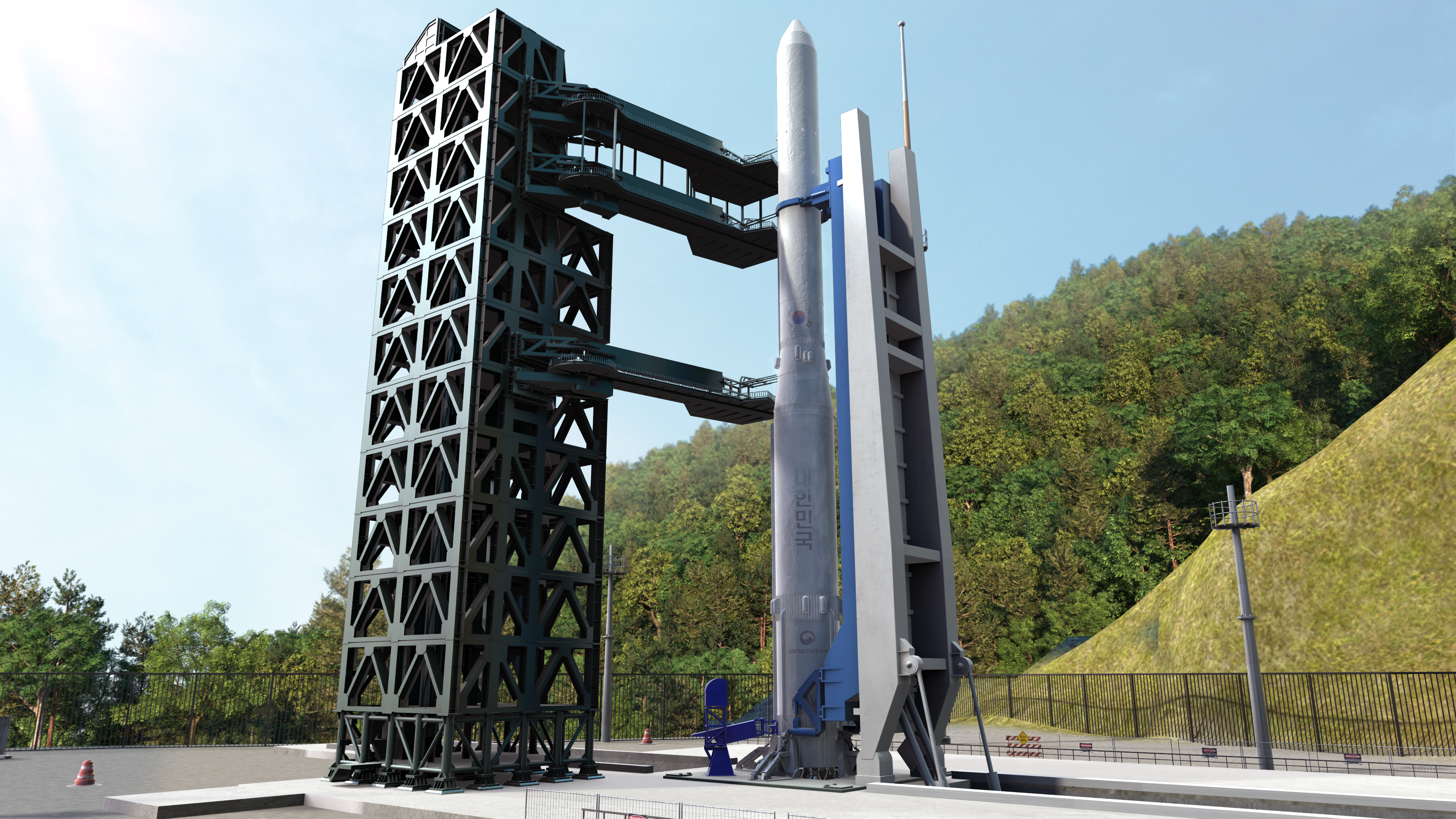
KSLV-II launch pad

== Criticism and controversies ==
HD Hyundai was alleged by a June 2025 UN expert's report to have provided heavy machinery that has been used to destroy property in the occupied Palestinian territories. Amnesty International Korea documented the use of HD Hyundai machinery during the demolitions of Palestinian homes and property in the occupied West Bank.

== See also ==
- List of shipbuilders and shipyards
- Defense industry of South Korea
- Ulsan HD FC, a South Korean football club owned by HD Hyundai Heavy Industries
- North Ocean Shipping Co. Ltd. v Hyundai Construction Co., Ltd.
- Hyundai and unions
