= Operation Dawn of Gulf of Aden =

Military operation

- Part of Piracy in Somalia, Operation Ocean Shield, Operation Enduring Freedom – Horn of Africa
- South Korean commandos raid the chemical tanker, MV Samho Jewelry, during Operation Dawn of Gulf of Aden.
Date	18–21 January 2011
Location	Arabian Sea, near the Gulf of Aden 14.5°N 56.5°E
Result	South Korean victory: All 21 hostages safely rescued

Belligerents
Republic of Korea Navy; Supported by: Royal Navy of Oman; United States Navy	Somali pirates

Commanders and leaders
Cho Young-joo	Abdi Risqe Shakh †; Suti Ali Harut †

Strength
1 destroyer 1 helicopter 30 ROKNSWF	1 chemical tanker 17~20 pirates

Casualties and losses
January 18: 3 wounded January 21: None	January 18: 4+ killed or missing January 21: 8 killed 5 captured
- 1 civilian wounded
- Approximate location of rescue operation

Operation Dawn of Gulf of Aden (Korean: 아덴만 여명 작전) was a naval operation by the Republic of Korea Navy against Somali pirates in the Arabian Sea. The operation was spurred by the pirates' seizure of the South Korean chemical tanker Samho Jewelry. In response, the South Korean government sent a destroyer and 30 naval commandos to retake the ship and rescue its crew. After trailing the tanker for several days and fighting a preliminary engagement that neutralized four of the pirates, the South Korean forces retook the ship by force on January 21, 2011, in a successful boarding action that resulted in the deaths of eight and the capture of five out of thirteen pirates.

== Background ==
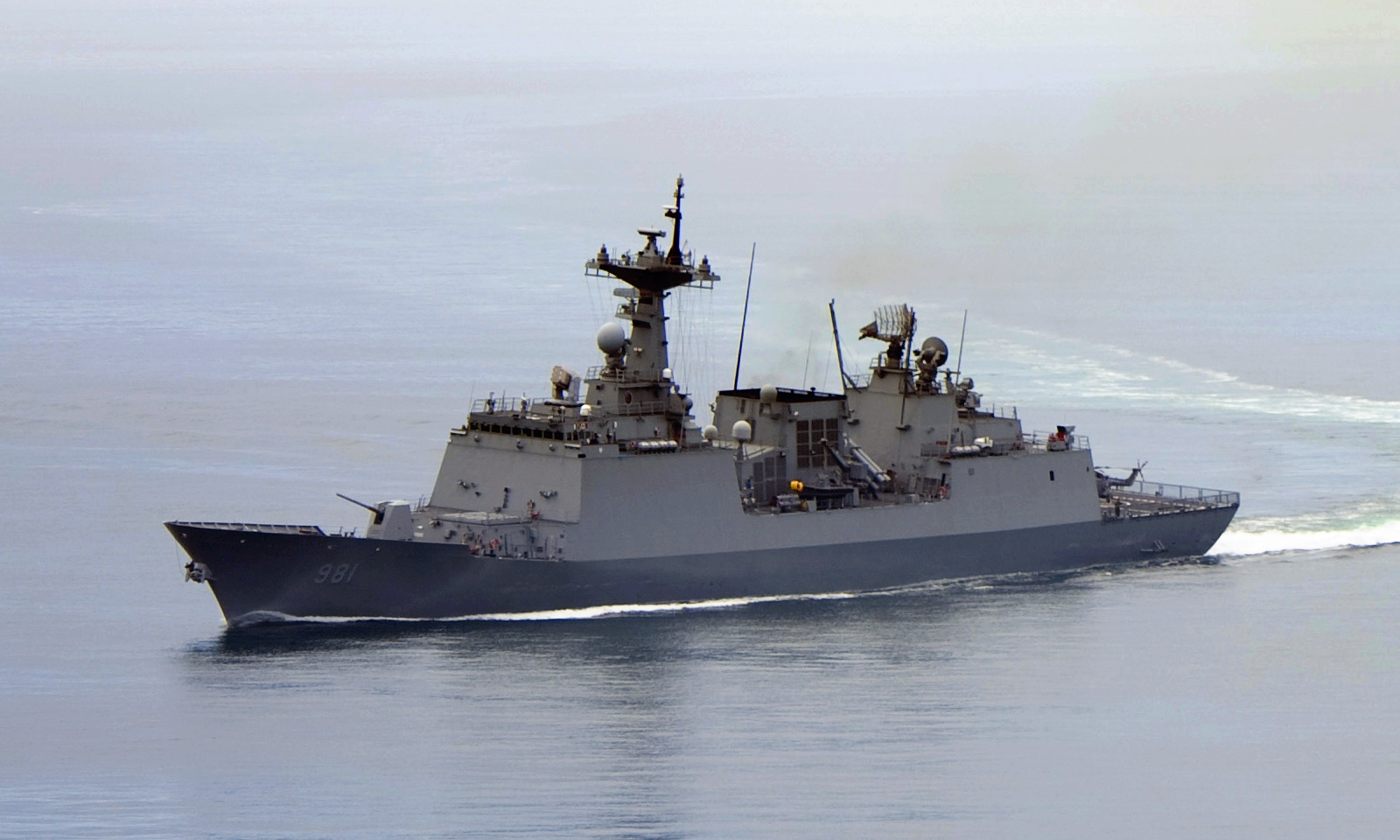
ROKS Choe Yeong in July 2010

On January 15, 2011, the Norwegian-owned chemical tanker Samho Jewelry was sailing through the Arabian Sea from the United Arab Emirates to Sri Lanka when it was attacked by a group of Somali pirates 350 nautical miles (600 km; 400 mi) southeast of the port of Muscat, Oman. Tanker captain Seok Hae-gyun changed the ship's course to keep in international waters as long as possible. The pirates eventually seized the tanker and used it as a base from which to launch attacks on other ships. The South Korean operator of the vessel, the Samho Shipping Company, was facing huge losses because it was obligated to continue paying Norwegian investors under its charter even while the vessel was held by pirates. However, the Norwegian government had no military presence in the area at the time. Eight South Koreans, eleven Burmese, and two Indonesians were among the 21 crewmembers being held hostage.

On January 16, South Korean president Lee Myung-bak issued an order to "comprehensively deal with" the crisis. The Chungmugong Yi Sun-shin-class destroyer ROKS Choe Yeong was dispatched under Captain Cho Young-joo, commander of the Cheonghae Anti-piracy Unit. The unit included members of the Republic of Korea Navy Special Warfare Flotilla. The 30 commandos aboard Choe Yeong could be deployed with several small boats and a Westland Super Lynx helicopter. Additionally, warships from the United States and Omani navies were nearby. In contrast, the pirates were outnumbered with only 17 men aboard the tanker. They were also outgunned by the Koreans, possessing only assault rifles and rocket propelled grenades.

== Engagements ==
Once Choe Yeong caught up with Samho Jewelry, it pursued the tanker until the pirates aboard were fatigued. Several fake attacks were staged to further wear down the pirate crew. Communications jamming was utilized to prevent the pirates from calling for assistance.

=== January 18 ===
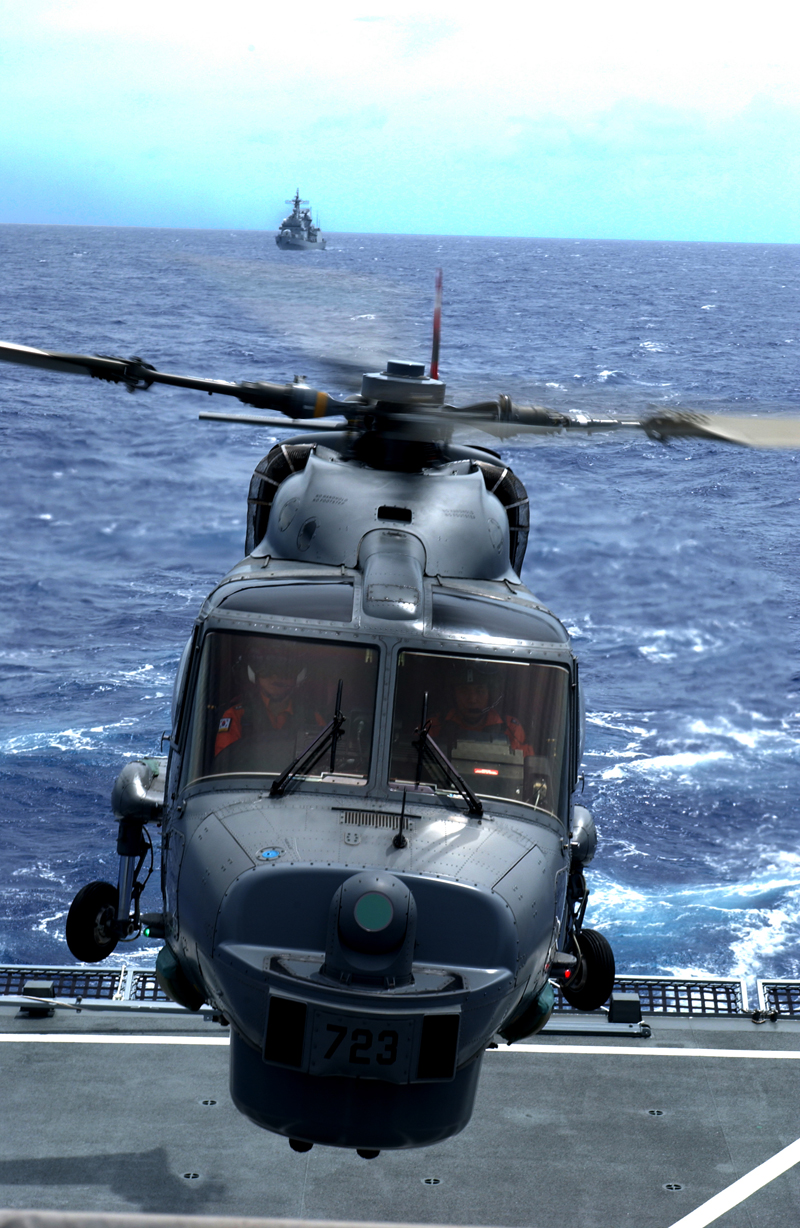
A South Korean Navy Westland Lynx in mid-2006

On January 18, the pirates aboard Samho Jewelry sighted a Mongolian cargo vessel about 11 km (5.9 nmi) away. Four of the pirates embarked on a small motorboat to hijack it. With only thirteen pirates remaining behind, a group of ten commandos from Choe Yeong attempted to approach Samho Jewelry in a speedboat. However, three of the commandos were injured in the ensuing firefight and the speedboat returned to the destroyer.

A Westland Lynx helicopter was sent after the hijackers in the motorboat heading towards the Mongolian ship. All four of the pirates from that confrontation were either killed or disappeared overboard. After the Mongolian vessel was able to proceed safely, the crew of Choe Yeong recovered the remnants of the hijackers' motorboat. Three rusty AK-47 rifles and an ammunition magazine were retrieved, along with three small iron ladders for boarding and various tools, including a screwdriver, a spanner, and several fishing knives. As the pirates had only six AK-47 rifles in total and three of them had now been confiscated, they had lost half of their firearms and about a quarter of their personnel.

After this engagement, the South Korean military decided to initiate a boarding operation, as intelligence reports suggested that the remaining captors were exhausted and that additional pirates were being dispatched from Somalia to reinforce them.

=== January 21 ===
The boarding of Samho Jewelry began on January 21 at 04:58 local time and took place at about 700 nautical miles (1,300 km; 800 mi) from Somalia's coast. While Navy commandos used three fast boats to reach the tanker, the helicopter from Choe Yeong fired upon the tanker, killing several pirates. Once the commandos boarded the ship, the pirates, armed with AK-47 assault rifles and rocket-propelled grenades, initiated a firefight that resulted in eight pirates killed and five captured; while the captain of the tanker was wounded, he was expected to survive. The U.S. Navy destroyer USS Shoup also assisted in the operation by evacuating the tanker's wounded captain via helicopter after the firefight had ended. In all, the operation took about five hours to complete. The rescue was called "a perfect military operation" by Lieutenant General Lee Sung-ho, Chief Director for Operations of the Joint Chiefs of Staff of the Republic of Korea.

== Aftermath ==
After news of the incident reached South Korea, South Korean President Lee Myung-bak appeared on television and praised the South Korean military for its actions in the operation and issued a warning that it would respond strongly to anyone who threatened the Korean people. The operation was seen as a huge success by the media, who noted the strong response to the pirates in contrast to the South Korean government's response to several North Korean provocations that had occurred in previous months such as the bombardment of Yeonpyeong. It was reported that due to the strong show of force by South Korea to the hijacking, some Somali pirates intended to "seek revenge" for the South Korean Navy's actions. The pirates said that they would no longer attempt to hold South Korean-flagged ships and sailors for ransom, but instead attack the ships and kill the sailors.

=== Legal proceedings ===
It was announced on January 29 that five pirates captured in the operation had been transported to South Korea, where they were charged with attempted murder and maritime robbery. The investigation proceeded in the city of Busan, as both Samho Jewelry and her captain were based there. After interrogating the captured pirates, the Republic of Korea Coast Guard determined that the leader, Abdi Risqe Shakh, 28, and his lieutenant, Suti Ali Harut, had been killed during one of the two raids. The surviving pirates denied knowing one another, nor who had shot the captain of the tanker, though investigators suspected Arai Mahomed of being the gunman. The defendants faced charges of maritime robbery, attempted murder and ship hijacking.

On May 27, 2011, Arai Mahomed was sentenced to life in prison, while three other pirates were sentenced to between 13 and 15 years in prison. The last pirate was tried separately, and received a sentence of 15 years in prison.

== See also ==
- List of armed conflicts and attacks, 2011
- List of ships attacked by Somali pirates in 2011
- Combined Task Force 150 and Combined Task Force 151, coalition counter-piracy operations in the region.
- Maersk Alabama hijacking
