= Cheonghae Unit =

South Korean military unit

- Insignia of the Cheonghae Unit
- Active: March 3, 2009 – present
- Country: South Korea
- Branch: Republic of Korea Navy
- Type: Naval task force
- Role: Anti-piracy, counter-terrorism
- Part of: Combined Task Force 151

Commanders
- Captain: Cho Young-joo

Insignia
- Banner of the Cheonghae Unit

The Cheonghae Unit (청해부대; 淸海部隊), alternatively known as Somalia Sea Escort Task Group (Korean: 소말리아 해역 호송전대), is the naval unit established by the Republic of Korea Navy to protect civilian ships near the coast of Somalia under Combined Task Force 151. The naval task force is named after the historical 9th-century Korean military base Cheonghaejin.

Deployed from Jinhae Naval Base, the modern-day unit is responsible for safely escorting hundreds of commercial vessels and several rescues involving ships from The Bahamas, Denmark, North Korea and South Korea. In January 2011, commandos in the Cheonghae Unit successfully executed a highly publicized rescue of a South Korean tanker, freeing crew members held hostage by Somali pirates.

== Operational history ==
=== 2009 ===
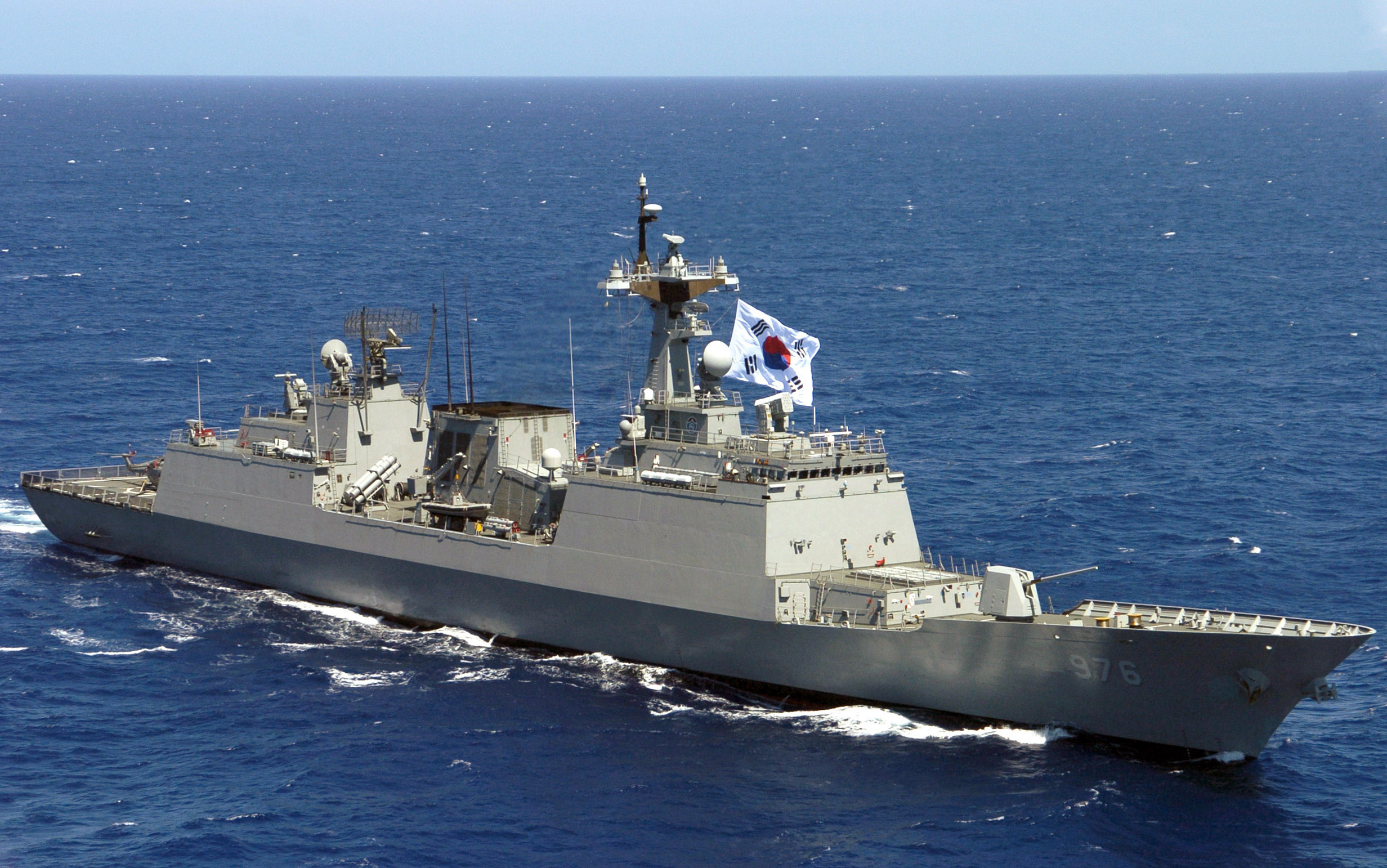
ROKS Munmu the Great

ROKS Munmu the Great was the first ship to be deployed as part of the unit to Somali waters on March 13, 2009. On April 17, it deterred pirates from boarding the cargo vessel Puma, which was registered in Denmark. On May 4, the Munmu the Great responded to a distress call by the North Korean merchant vessel Dabaksol. A Westland Lynx military helicopter was launched to protect the Dabaksol until the pirates had fled. The North Korean sailors thanked the members of the unit before proceeding to India. A member of the Joint Chiefs of Staff of the Republic of Korea stated, "This is the first time that the South Korean navy has rescued a North Korean cargo ship from a pirate’s attack. According to the international law of the sea, we should help all vessel[s] regardless of their nationality."

ROKS Dae Joyeong was dispatched in July 2009 to relieve the Munmu the Great, and rescued four civilian vessels. In August, the Dae Joyeong raided a pirate vessel that had been pursuing the Bahamian container ship Notos Scan. In September, it freed the Cypriot commercial vessel Alexandria, along with five Yemeni crew members who were being held by pirates.

ROKS Yi Sun-shin was deployed in November 2009 to become the third ship of the unit. It defeated pirates twice while escorting 460 vessels during its tour of duty.

=== 2010 ===
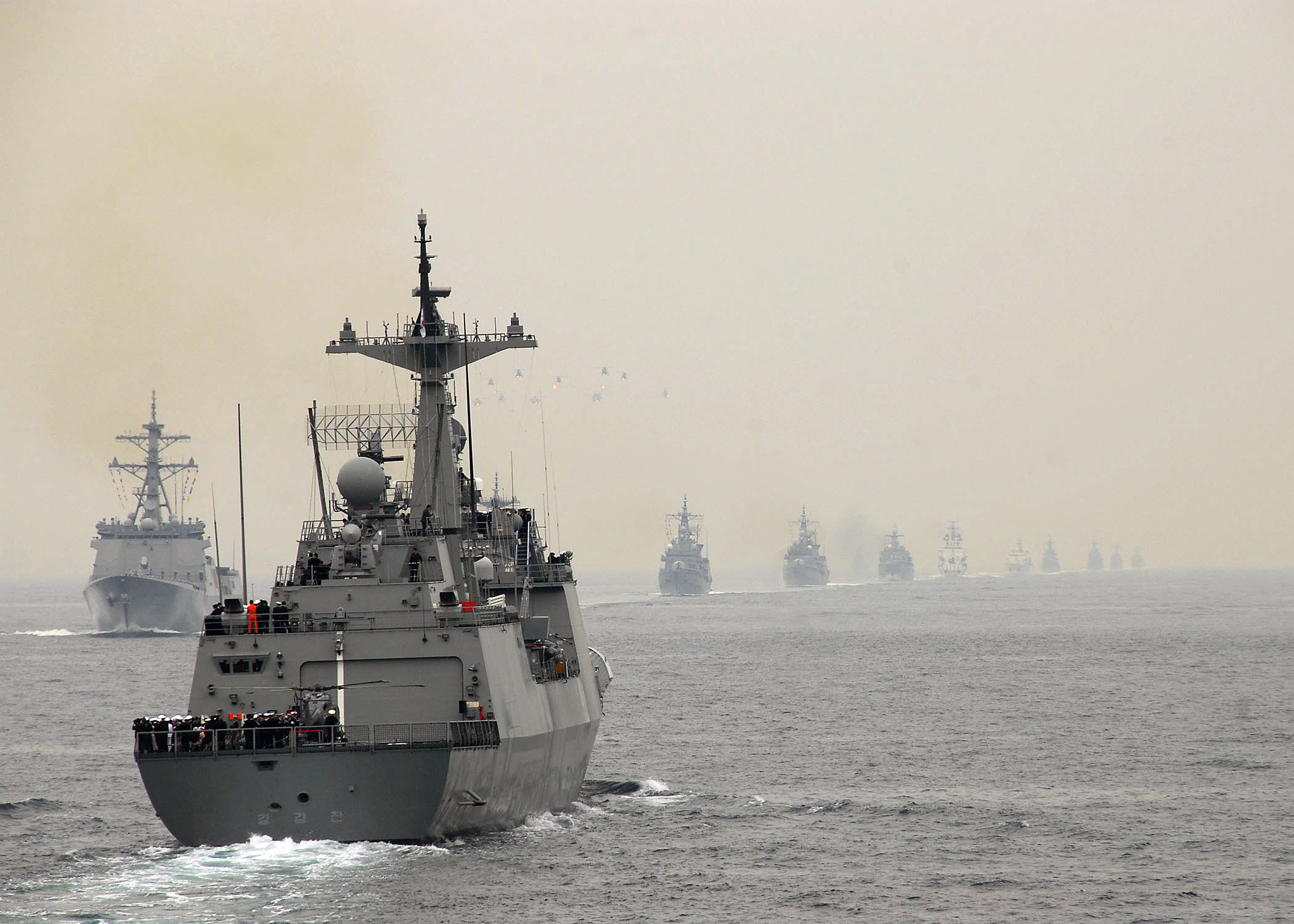
ROKS Kang Gamchan

On April 4, 2010, Somali pirates took over the South Korean supertanker Samho Dream along with its 24 crew members, including five Koreans and nineteen Filipinos. When the Yi Sun-shin pursued the hijacked vessel, the pirates threatened to kill the tanker crew.

ROKS Kang Gamchan relieved the Yi Sun-shin in May 2010, and transported injured crew members from a Bahamian drilling ship to a hospital later that month. In August, the Kang Gamchan also provided medical assistance to the crew of a ship registered in Hong Kong.

ROKS Wang Geon was deployed later that year to become the fifth ship of the unit. Among the 432 vessels it escorted was the Samho Dream, which had finally been released by pirates in November for a record ransom payment of $9.5 million.

=== 2011 rescue operation ===
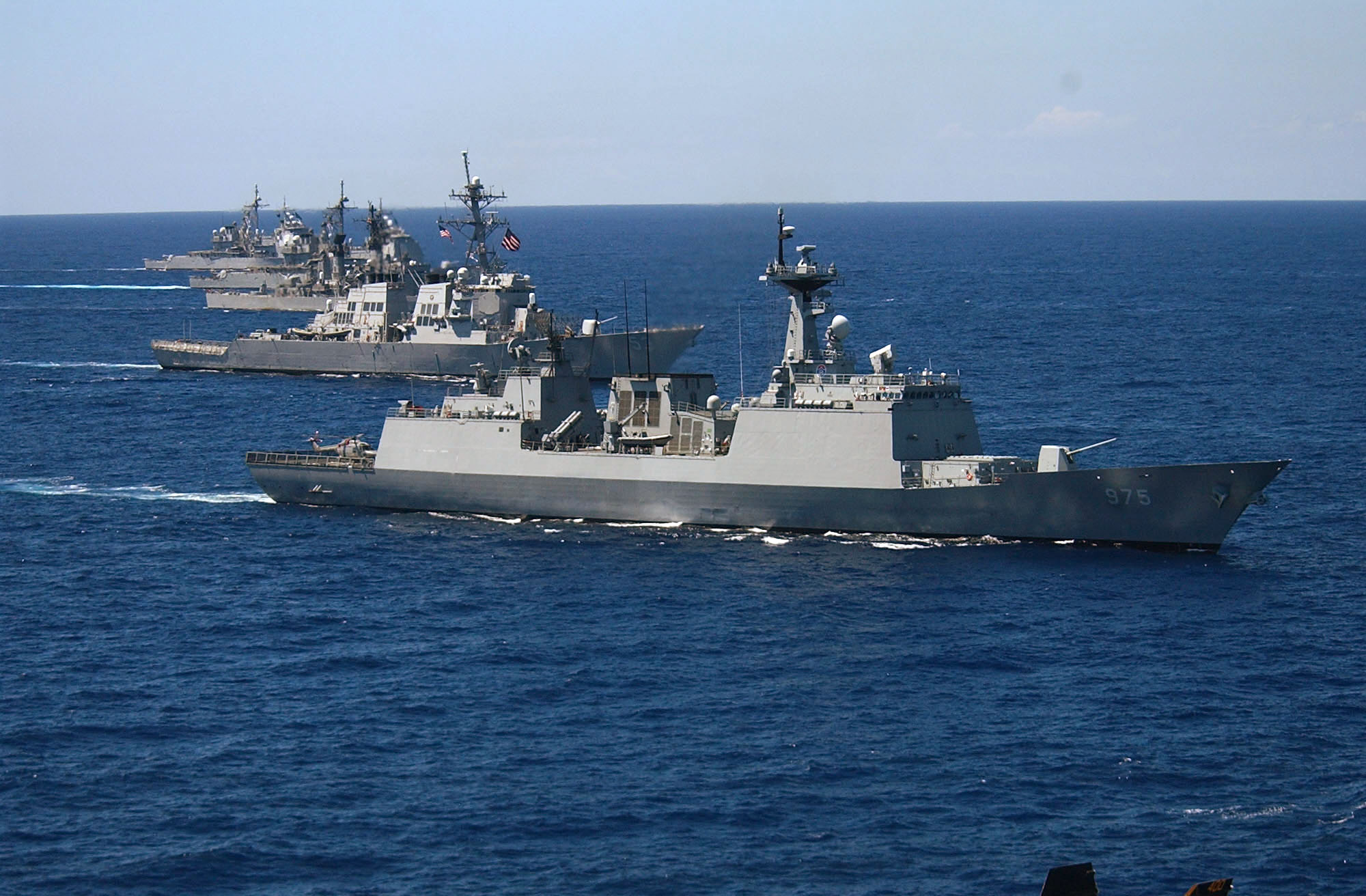
ROKS Yi Sun-shin

On January 21, 2011, the Cheonghae Unit rescued the crew of the Samho Jewelry, a chemical tanker held hostage by Somali pirates; 8 pirates were killed, and 5 were captured. The captain of the tanker was wounded during the operation, but the rest of the crew members were unhurt.

=== 2021 COVID-19 infections ===
On 19 July 2021, it is reported that 247 out of 301 crew members of the 34th contingent of the Cheonghae Unit on the Munmu the Great was tested positive for the COVID-19. Two Korean Air Force KC-330 departed with 200 replacement members to transport the 301 entire crew members back to South Korea. After returning to South Korea, it is revealed that 270 crew members are tested positive.

=== Unit rotation ===
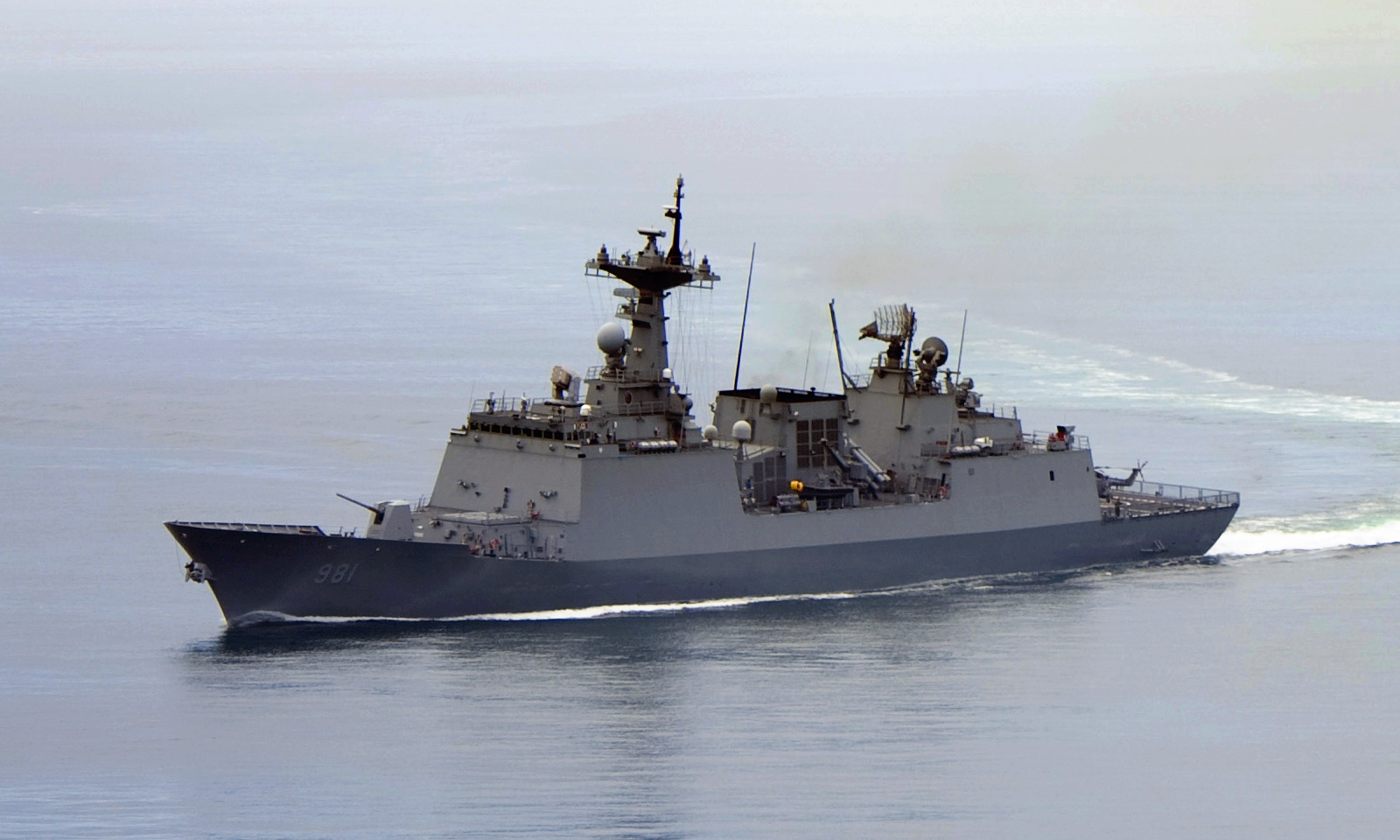
ROKS Choe Yeong

Rotation	Size	List of ships	Sailing off	Mission start	Mission end	Return to port	Notes & events
1st	300	DDH-976 Munmu the Great	13 March 2009	16 April 2009	19 August 2009	14 September 2009	
2nd	300	DDH-977 Dae Jo-yeong	16 July 2009	19 August 2009	23 December 2009	18 January 2010	
3rd	300	DDH-975 Chungmugong Yi Sun-sin	20 November 2009	23 December 2009	21 April 2010	20 May 2010	
4th	300	DDH-979 Gang Gam-chan	2 April 2010	21 April 2010	12 September 2010	4 October 2010	
5th	300	DDH-978 Wang Geon	9 July 2010	13 September 2010	28 December 2010	20 January 2011	
6th	300	DDH-981 Choe Yeong	8 December 2010	29 December 2010	5 May 2011	27 May 2011	Operation Dawn of Gulf of Aden; Libyan Civil War
7th	300	DDH-975 Chungmugong Yi Sun-sin	5 April 2011	6 May 2011	12 September 2011	4 October 2011	
8th	300	DDH-976 Munmu the Great	12 August 2011	13 September 2011	14 January 2012	10 February 2012	
9th	300	DDH-977 Dae Jo-yeong	16 December 2011	15 January 2012	22 May 2012	15 June 2012	
10th	300	DDH-978 Wang Geon	23 April 2012	23 May 2012	11 September 2012	22 October 2012	
11th	300	DDH-979 Gang Gam-chan	20 August 2012	12 September 2012			

== See also ==
- Combined Task Force 151
- List of ships attacked by Somali pirates in 2011
- Piracy in Somalia
