= United States Penitentiary, Atwater =

Federal prison near Atwater, California

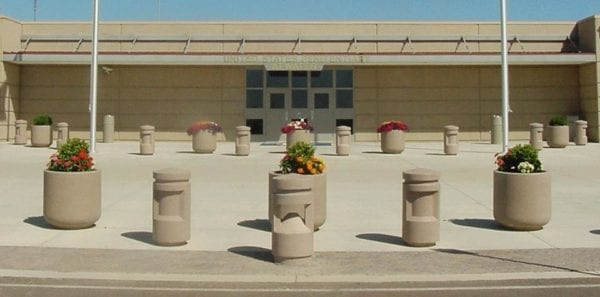
- Interactive map of United States Penitentiary, Atwater
- Location: Merced County, California; 37°23′10″N 120°33′30″W
- Status: Operational
- Security class: High-security (with minimum-security satellite camp)
- Population: 1,187 [1,082 at the USP, 105 in prison camp] (September 2023)
- Opened: 2001
- Managed by: Federal Bureau of Prisons
- Warden: B. M. Trate

The United States Penitentiary, Atwater (USP Atwater) is a high-security United States federal prison for male inmates in unincorporated Merced County, California. The institution also includes a minimum-security satellite camp. It is operated by the Federal Bureau of Prisons, a division of the United States Department of Justice.

USP Atwater is located on land formerly part of Castle Air Force Base. It is near the city of Atwater, 130 miles from San Francisco.

== Facility and programs ==
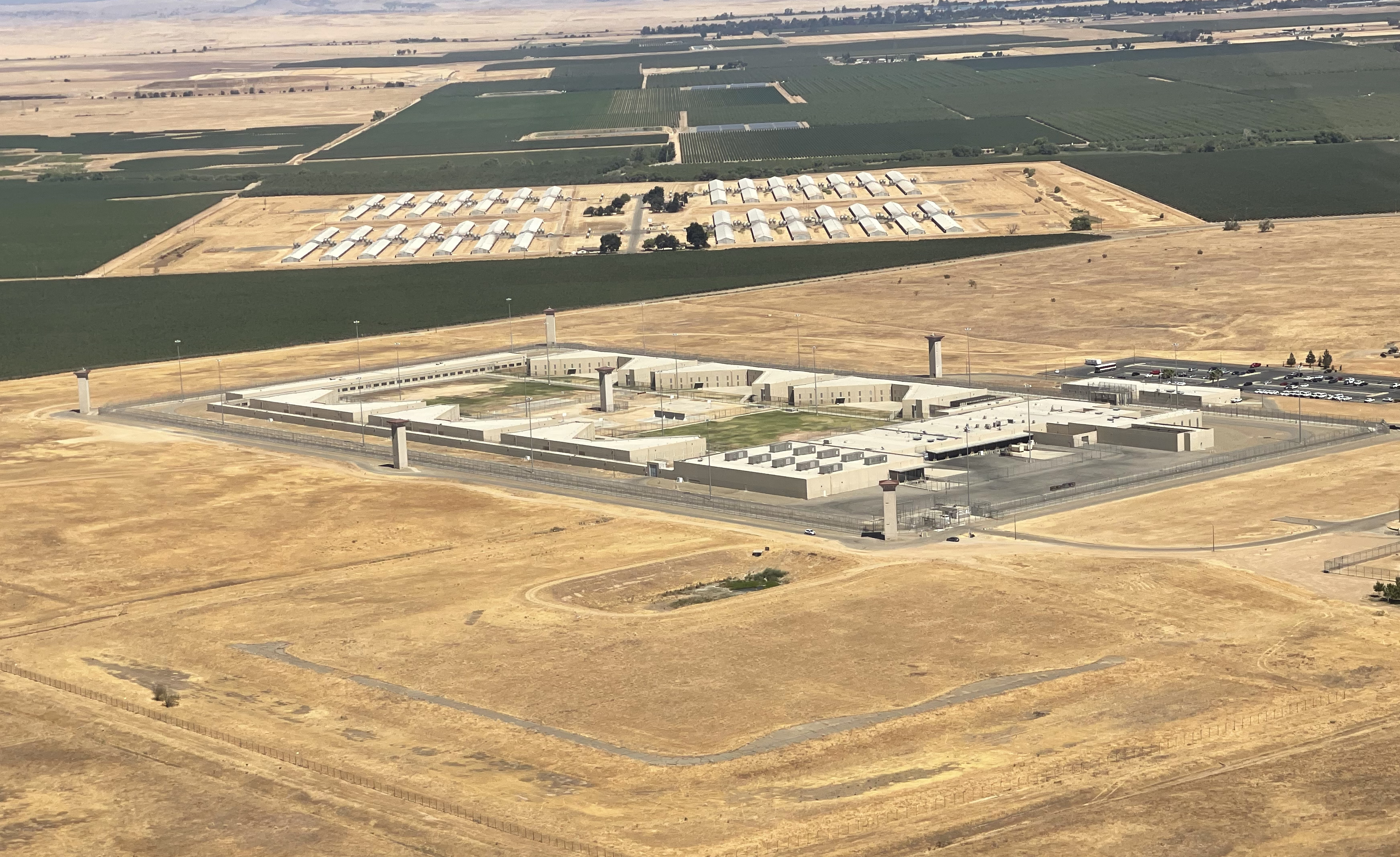
Aerial view of United States Penitentiary, Atwater (2021)

USP Atwater offers various educational programs, including mandatory GED classes for inmates without high school diplomas, occupational and vocational training with apprenticeships, adult continuing education, parenting classes and leisure programs.

== Notable incidents ==
=== Murder of Correction Officer Jose Rivera ===
On June 20, 2008, as Federal Correction Officer Jose Rivera was conducting his daily count on the second floor, inmate Joseph Cabrera Sablan attacked Officer Rivera with an eight-inch self-made knife or shank. Outnumbered, Officer Rivera attempted to seek assistance, but was knocked backwards by Sablan and tackled by inmate James Ninete Leon Guerrero. Both inmates had been previously convicted of murder and were serving life sentences. As Officer Rivera was seeking assistance from the first floor, he tripped on the stairs and was held down by Guerrero as Sablan stabbed him in excess of 20 times. Despite his injuries, Officer Rivera was able to restrain both inmates until additional officers arrived. Officer Rivera was transported to a local hospital, but died shortly afterward.

The Federal Bureau of Investigation investigated the incident, and Sablan and Guerrero were indicted for the murder of Officer Rivera on August 14, 2008.

On May 30, 2014, Guerrero was sentenced to life in prison without the possibility of release. Guerrero was sentenced by U.S. District Judge Phillip Pro of the District of Nevada.

On September 29, 2015, Sablan was sentenced to life in prison without the possibility of release.

=== Inmate murder ===
On August 2, 2006, Juwan Ferguson and the victim, Domosanies Slaughter, were cellmates in the Special Housing Unit at USP Atwater. Ferguson, a repeat felon with a lengthy criminal history, told several correctional officers at different times during that day that he wanted Slaughter removed from his cell. After he repeated this request to another officer, Slaughter hit Ferguson in the face. Ferguson responded by beating Slaughter into unconsciousness and then continuing to beat him even after he was unconscious. Correctional officers observed Ferguson drag Slaughter out from underneath one of the beds in the cell. Ignoring orders to stop, Ferguson continued to strike Slaughter's head against the concrete floor and kick the back of his head until he was restrained. Slaughter was transported to an area hospital, where he died on August 8, 2006.

In July 2009, Ferguson was convicted of voluntary manslaughter and was subsequently sentenced to life in prison. Ferguson's sentence was overturned on appeal and he was resentenced to 96 months in prison in 2011. Ferguson served his sentence at Florence ADX, the federal supermax prison in Colorado, and was released in 2018.

John Balazs, the attorney who defended Ferguson, argued that the Federal Bureau of Prisons was partially at fault for Slaughter's death, mainly because Slaughter had been diagnosed with schizophrenia and USP Atwater was not properly equipped to address Slaughter's condition. In addition, Ferguson had asked corrections officials to move Slaughter out of his cell and Ferguson did not start the fight.

== Notable inmates (current and former) ==
†The Sentencing Reform Act of 1984 eliminated parole for federal inmates. However, inmates sentenced for offenses committed prior to 1987 are eligible for parole consideration.

Inmate Name	Register Number	Status	Details
Jerry Whitworth	78095-011	Serving a 365-year sentence; eligible for release on May 13, 2224.†	Former senior chief petty officer for the US Navy; convicted in 1986 of espionage for selling highly classified US Navy documents to the Soviet Union for $332,000; co-conspirator and former US Navy chief warrant officer John Anthony Walker testified against him.
Bobby Banks	20110-009	Scheduled for release in 2039; now at FCI Forrest City	Leader of the Crips street gang in Little Rock, Arkansas; convicted in 2006 of conspiracy and drug trafficking for directing a large-scale crack-cocaine distribution operation; appeared in the 1993 HBO documentary Gang War: Bangin' In Little Rock.
Agustin Huneeus	25453-111	Released March 17, 2020; served over five months.	Charged with connection to the 2019 college admissions bribery scandal.
Khalid Ali-M Aldawsari	42771-177	Serving life sentence; now at USP Pollock	Saudi Arabian national convicted in 2012 of attempted use of a weapon of mass destruction by a US federal court.
Demario Atwater	24520-057	Serving a life sentence	Pled guilty to charges of first-degree murder, first-degree kidnapping, armed robbery, possession of a firearm by a felon and possession of a weapon of mass destruction, all related to the murder of Eve Carson.
Cristóbal Véliz	88389-054	Serving a life sentence.	Responsible for the Murders of Bernice and Ben Novack Jr.
Darren Berg	17950-086	Escaped on December 6, 2017	Sentenced to 18 years in February 2012 for financial crimes. Had been in the minimum-security camp.
Timothy "Mozzy" Patterson	68566-509	Released on May 4, 2023	American rapper convicted of federal gun charges, served a ten-month sentence.
Solomon Pena	62635-510	Serving an 80-year sentence; scheduled for release on March 19, 2091.	Political candidate for the New Mexico House of Representatives in 2022 who attempted to orchestrate the murder of his political opponents.
Mohamud Salad Ali	77992-083	Serving a life sentence.	Somali pirate leader; pleaded guilty in 2011 to piracy in connection with the 2011 hijacking of the civilian yacht Quest, during which four US citizens were killed; Nine other pirates are serving life sentences at other federal facilities.
Robert Justus	26299-111	Serving a life sentence.	Committed, along with U.S. Air Force sergeant Steven Carrillo, two ambush-style attacks against security personnel and law enforcement officers in California. Charged with aiding and abetting murder and aiding and abetting attempted murder.

== See also ==
- List of U.S. federal prisons
- Federal Bureau of Prisons
- Incarceration in the United States
