= ROKS Munmu the Great =

Daegu-class frigate

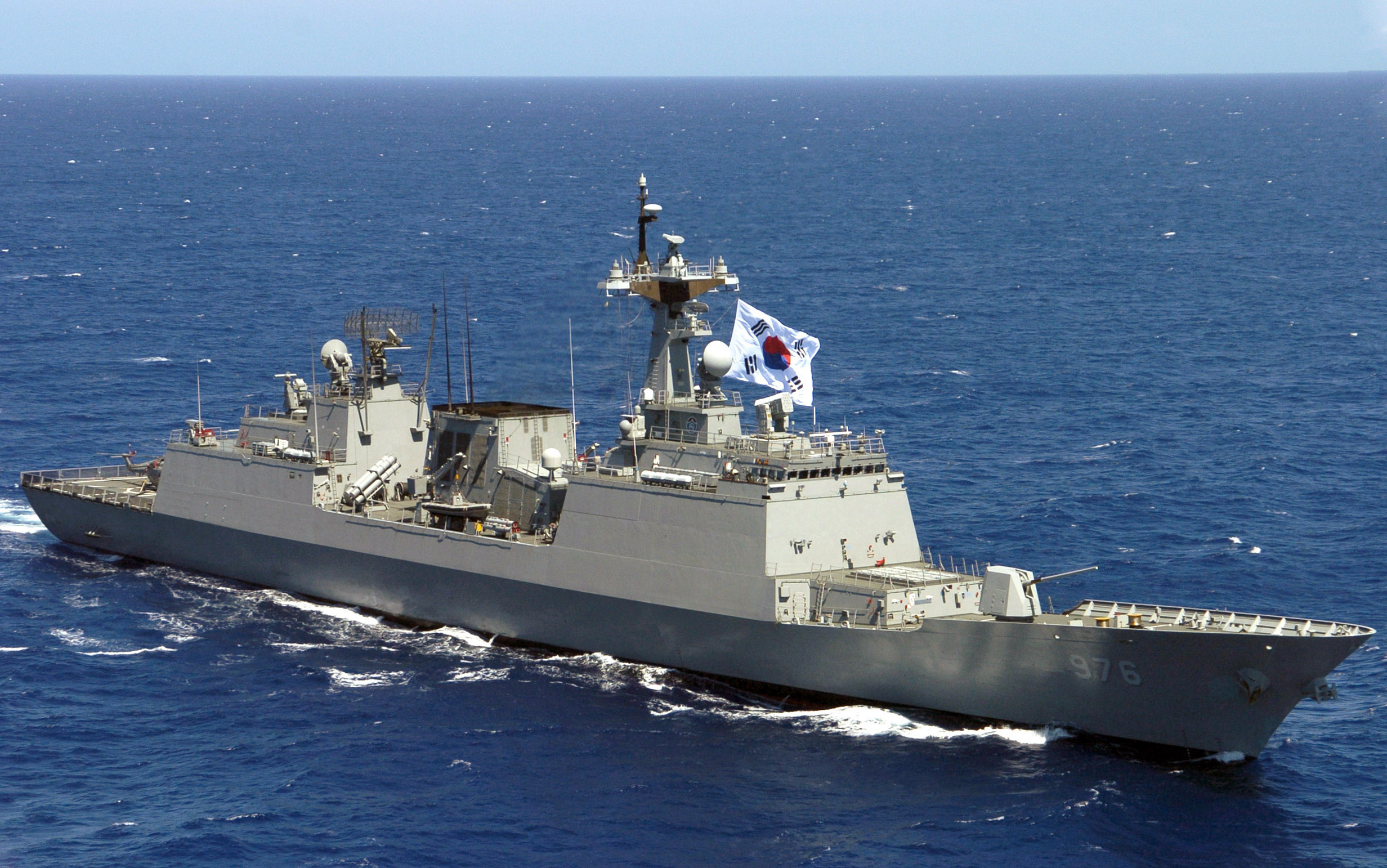
- ROKS Munmu the Great on 25 July 2006

History

South Korea
- Name: Munmu the Great; (문무대왕함)
- Namesake: Munmu of Silla
- Builder: Hyundai
- Launched: 11 April 2003
- Commissioned: 30 September 2004
- Identification: Pennant number: DDH-976
- Status: Active

General characteristics
- Class & type: Chungmugong Yi Sun-sin-class destroyer
- Displacement: 4,400 t (4,300 long tons) standard; 5,520 t (5,430 long tons) full load
- Length: 150 m (492 ft 2 in)
- Beam: 17.4 m (57 ft 1 in)
- Draft: 9.5 m (31 ft 2 in)
- Propulsion: Combined diesel or gas
- Speed: 30 knots (56 km/h; 35 mph)
- Range: 10,200 km (5,500 nmi)
- Complement: 200
- Armament: 1 × 5"/54 caliber Mark 45 gun; 1 × Goalkeeper CIWS; 64 × VLS; 21 × RIM-116 Rolling Airframe Missile; 8 × RGM-84 Harpoon; 2 × triple K745 Blue Shark Torpedo
- Aircraft carried: 2 × Super Lynx helicopters
- Aviation facilities: Helicopter landing platform and Hangar

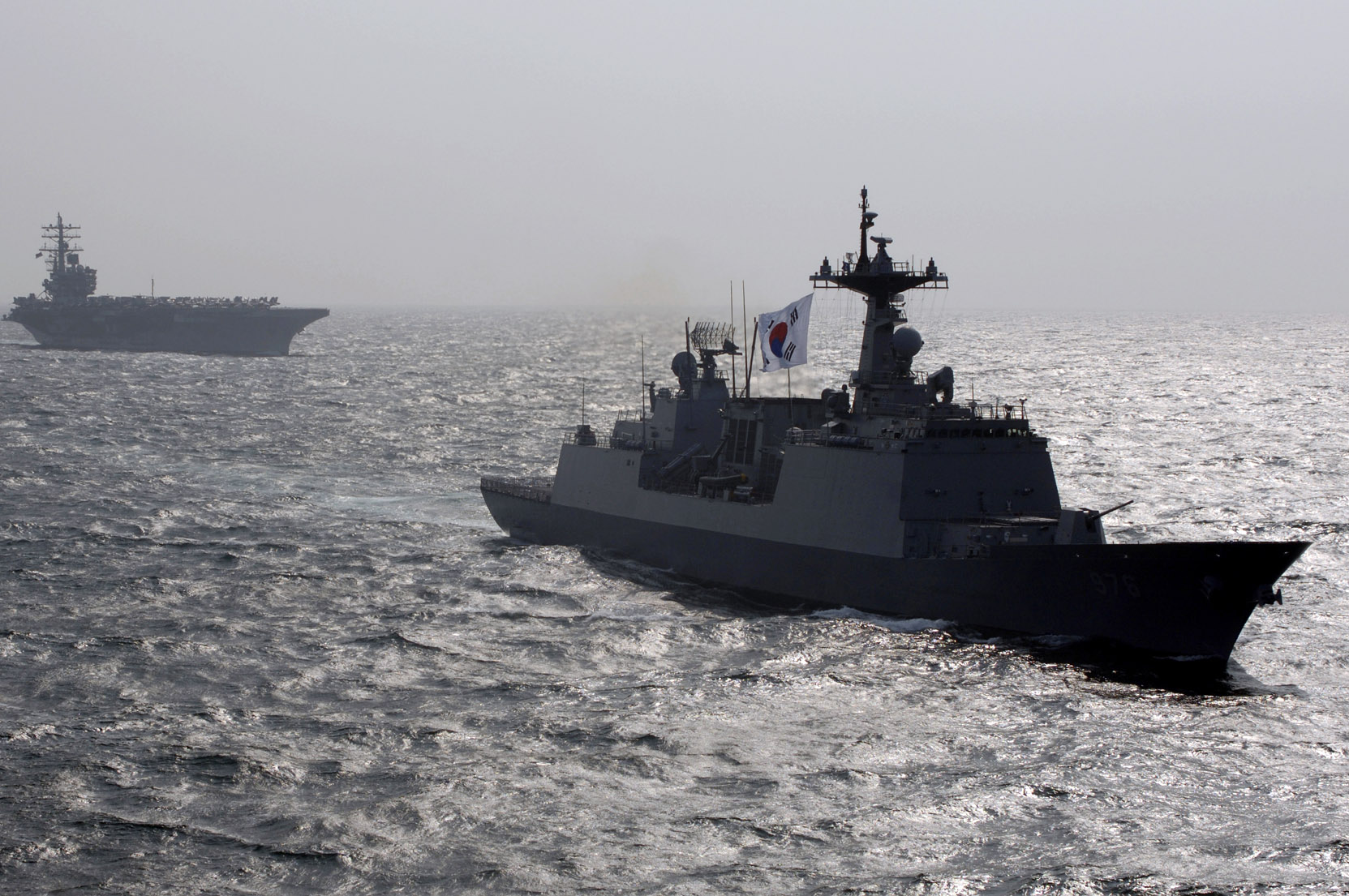
ROKS Munmu the Great in formation with USS Ronald Reagan during Foal Eagle (RSOI/FE) 2007

ROKS Munmu the Great (DDH-976) is a Chungmugong Yi Sun-sin-class destroyer in the South Korean navy. It was named after Munmu of Silla.

== Design ==
The KDX-II is part of a much larger build up program aimed at turning the ROKN into a blue-water navy. It is said to be the first stealthy major combatant in the ROKN and was designed to significantly increase the ROKN's capabilities.

== Construction and career ==
In March 2009, Munmu the Great was sent overseas to protect merchant vessels from Somali pirates. On 28 May 2007 during firing exercise on the open sea near Jinhae one of the projectiles exploded inside the 127 mm gun barrel which has been replaced later. In 2014 she conducted anti-piracy drills as part of Combined Task Force 151 in the Indian Ocean with HMS Defender.

In April 2018, it was deployed to Ghana with personnel from the Special Warfare Brigade as part of a mission to rescue kidnapped South Korean fishermen.

On 19 July 2021, it was reported that 247 out of 301 crew members of the 34th contingent of the Cheonghae Unit on Munmu the Great tested positive for COVID-19. Two Korean Air Force KC-330 departed with 200 replacement members to transport all 301 crew members back to South Korea. After returning to South Korea, it was revealed that 270 crew members had tested positive.

From 26 to 29 October 2026, she participated in the second edition of the Indian Navy-RoKN Bilateral Exercise with INS Sahyadri. The harbour phase was held at Busan Naval Base.

== Gallery ==
ROKS Munmu the Great Gallery

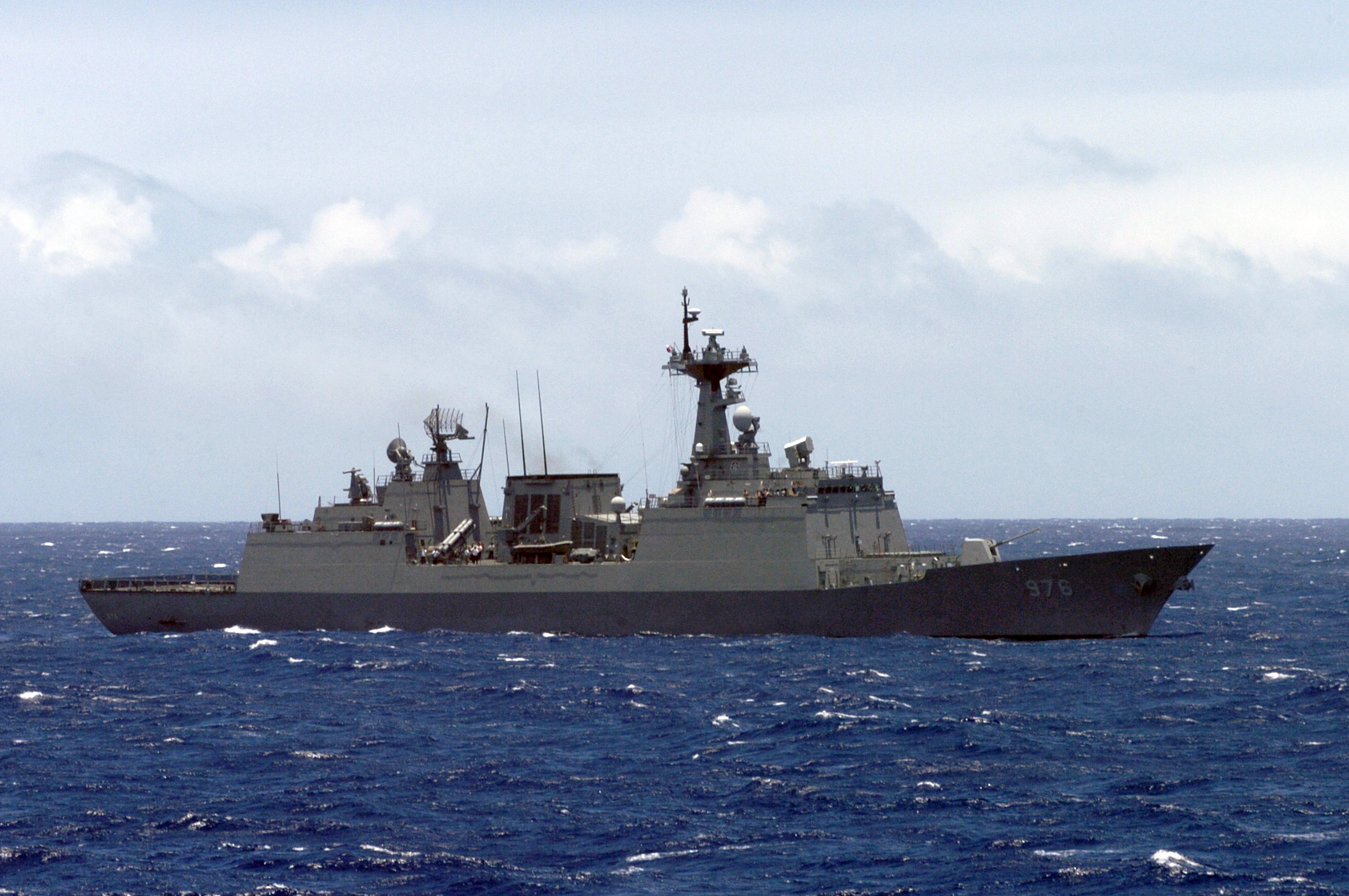
ROKS Munmu the Great maneuvering during RIMPAC 2006.

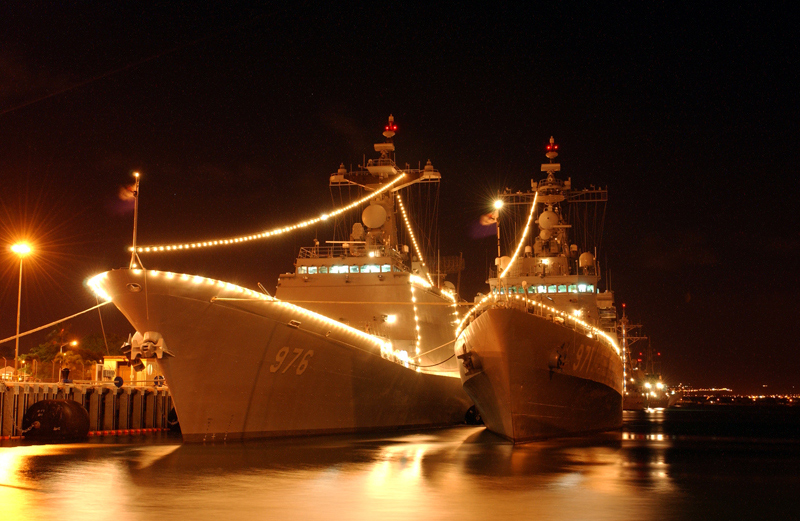
ROKS Munmu the Great and ROKS Gwanggaeto the Great lighted ship's lights to celebrate the July 4th Independence Day 2006.

== See also ==
- Korean Destroyer eXperimental
- Gwanggaeto the Great-class destroyer (KD-I)
- Sejong the Great-class destroyer (KD-III)
