= SY Quest incident =

Piracy in Somalia

- Part of Piracy in Somalia, Operation Ocean Shield, Operation Enduring Freedom – Horn of Africa
Date	4–22 February 2011
Location	Oman, Indian Ocean
Result	American victory: Yacht recaptured; Capture and arrest of pirates; Hostages killed by pirates

Belligerents
United States	Somali pirates

Commanders and leaders
(United States) Dee Mewbourne	Mohamud Salad Ali

Strength
1 supercarrier 1 cruiser 2 destroyers	1 yacht

Casualties and losses
None	4 killed 15 captured 1 yacht captured
- Civilian casualties: 4 killed

The SY Quest incident occurred in February 2011 when Somali pirates seized the American yacht SY Quest (s/v Quest) and four United States citizens. The United States Navy ordered SEAL Team Six Gold Squadron, aircraft carrier USS Enterprise, and three other ships to free the hostages. All four hostages were shot by their captors.

The SY Quest was the first U.S. vessel captured by Somali pirates since the Maersk Alabama in 2009.

== Incident ==
According to American reports, the SY Quest was captured on 18 February 2011 at 13.23 UTC by nineteen pirates in a mothership, 190 to 240 miles off the coast of Oman around 18°00′N 61°02′E in the Indian Ocean. Pirates then tried sailing the SY Quest towards Puntland. Sometime thereafter USS Enterprise, the guided missile cruiser USS Leyte Gulf and the guided missile destroyers USS Sterett and USS Bulkeley were sent to the area; they arrived several days later on or about 21 February. Captain Dee Mewbourne, of the Enterprise, and Navigator Christopher Saindon opened negotiations with the pirates, at which time two Somalis went aboard the Sterett. As negotiations continued the following morning, 22 February, a pirate aboard the SY Quest fired a rocket-propelled grenade at the Sterett from 600 yards away but it missed. Almost immediately afterward, gunfire was heard aboard the yacht, so a boarding party was sent in on a raft and they boarded the SY Quest. In a brief skirmish that followed, two pirates were killed, one by rifle fire and the other by a combat knife. Thirteen pirates surrendered and were taken into custody.

Navy officials said all four hostages were shot by their captors: Phyllis Macay and Robert Riggle, of Seattle, Washington, and the SY Quest's owners, Jean and Scott Adam of Marina del Rey, California.

The bodies of two other pirates were also found aboard the SY Quest though United States Navy officials had no explanation for their deaths. A few days later, Vice Admiral Mark I. Fox, said the Americans had no intention of attacking but were obligated after hearing small-arms fire.

The pirate leader Mohamud, in Somalia, claimed that the hostages were killed because the American warships started to attack and he told Reuters that "we ordered our comrades to kill the four Americans before they got killed." The leader Farah, in Bayla, Puntland, told Reuters, "I lost the money I invested and my comrades. No forgiveness for the Americans. Revenge. Our business will go on". He said he had spent $110,000 on food, weapons, and salaries for the hijacking.

Thirteen of the pirates were found to be Somalis and the other a Yemeni; they were sent to Norfolk, Virginia to face charges of piracy and kidnapping.

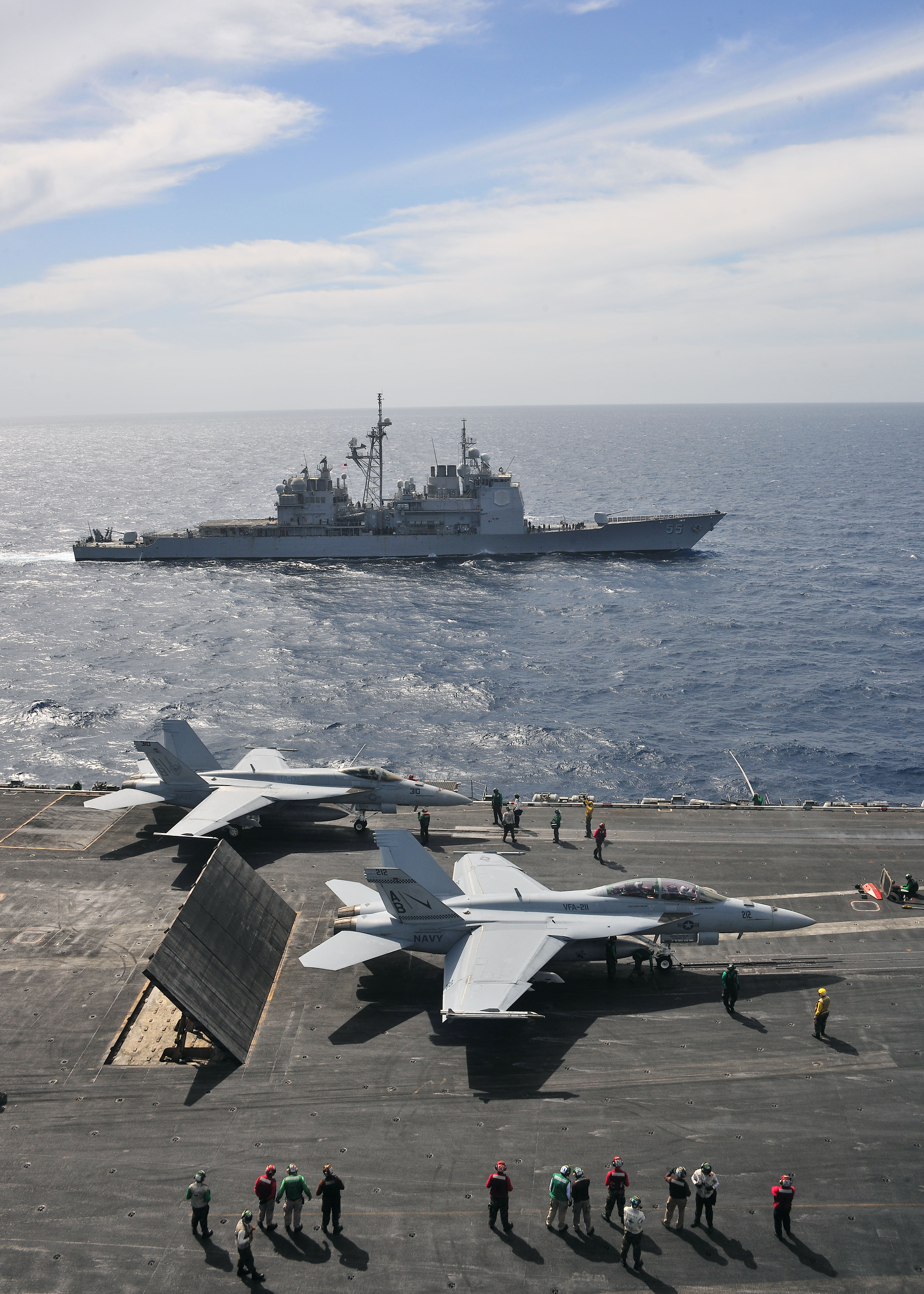
USS Leyte Gulf alongside USS Enterprise while conducting flight operations in the Red Sea on 3 March 2011.

== Trial ==
On 8 July 2013 Ahmed Muse Salad, a/k/a "Afmagalo", 27, Abukar Osman Beyle, 33, and Shani Nurani Shiekh Abrar, 31–those who actually killed the 4 hostages–were found guilty of piracy, murder within the Special Maritime and Territorial Jurisdiction of the United States, violence against maritime navigation, conspiracy to commit violence against maritime navigation resulting in death, kidnapping resulting in death, conspiracy to commit kidnapping, hostage taking resulting in death, conspiracy to commit hostage taking resulting in death and multiple firearms offenses. All three were sentenced in November 2013 and all received 21 life sentences, 19 consecutive life sentences and 2 concurrent life sentences, and 30 years consecutive.

According to U.S. federal law, committing an act of piracy resulting in death has a mandatory life sentence.

14 men were prosecuted in the United States District Court for the Eastern District of Virginia for taking part in seizing of Quest. Federal prosecutors sought the death penalty for Ahmed Muse Salad, Abukar Osman Beyle, and Shani Nurani Abrar, however, they were sentenced to life in prison. Mohammed Saaili Shibin, who acted as a negotiator between the pirates and U.S. forces, was also sentenced to life imprisonment. All the defendants names, BOP Numbers, sentences and places of incarceration are listed below:

Inmate name	Register number	Status	Incarcerated at	Reference
Mahdi Jama Mohamed	77985-083	Deceased on 22 August 2023	—N/a	
Mounir Ali	77986-083	Scheduled for release on 2 May 2033	FCI Lompoc	
Abukar Osman Beyle	77988-083	Serving a life sentence	USP Tucson	
Jilani Abdali	77989-083	Scheduled for release on 18 February 2037	USP McCreary	
Ahmed Muse Salad	77991-083	Serving a life sentence	USP Victorville	
Mohamud Salad Ali	77992-083	Serving a life sentence	USP Florence High	
Shani Nurani Abrar	77993-083	Serving a life sentence	USP Terre Haute	
Said Abdi Fooley	77994-083	Serving a life sentence	USP Beaumont	
Muhidin Salad Omar	77995-083	Serving a life sentence	USP Coleman II	
Ahmed Sala Ali Burale	77996-083	Scheduled for release on 20 December 2039	FCI Yazoo City Medium	
Ali Abdi Mohamed	77997-083	Scheduled for release on 26 March 2040	USP Lompoc	
Mohamud Hirs Issa Ali	77998-083	Scheduled for release on 15 September 2036	FCI Beaumont Low	
Burhan Abdirahm Yusuf	77999-083	Scheduled for release on 25 November 2035	FCI Yazoo City Medium	
Abdi Jama Aqid	78000-083	Serving a life sentence	USP Atwater	
Mohammed Saaili Shibin	78207-083	Deceased on 17 March 2024	—N/a	

== See also ==
- List of ships attacked by Somali pirates in 2011
- List of operations conducted by SEAL Team Six
