= MV Samho Jewelry =

Ship

History
- Name: Samho Jewelry
- Owner: Acta Group, Norway
- Operator: Samho Shipping Company, South Korea
- Port of registry: Valletta, Malta
- Route: United Arab Emirates to Sri Lanka
- Launched: 26 July 2001
- Completed: 2001
- Identification: Call sign: 9HHF9; IMO number: 9249594; MMSI number: 256981000
- Status: In service

General characteristics
- Type: Chemical tanker
- Tonnage: 11,566 GT
- Length: 145.5 m (477 ft 4 in)
- Beam: 23.7 m (77 ft 9 in)
- Draft: 9.71 m (31 ft 10 in)
- Crew: 21 (January 2011)

MV Samho Jewelry (Hangul: 삼호 주얼리) is a Norwegian-owned and South Korean-operated chemical tanker. She was hijacked by Somali pirates on January 15, 2011, and rescued six days later by South Korean Navy commandos.

== Description ==
Built in 2001, the Samho Jewelry has a gross tonnage of 11,566 GT. She is 145.5 metres (477 ft 4 in) long and has a beam of 23.7 metres (77 ft 9 in) and a draft of 9.7 metres (31 ft 10 in). Owned by 2,500 investors represented by the Acta Group in Norway, the ship is registered in the port of Valletta, Malta and operated by the Samho Shipping Company of Busan, South Korea.

== History ==
In January 2008, the Samho Jewelry was placed under inspection in Mumbai by the International Transport Workers' Federation for labor issues related to flag of convenience practices. Investigators found that Burmese, Croatian, Polish and Russian crewmembers were being paid less than ITF minimum wages and directed the owners of the vessel to sign a wage agreement with the Korean Seafarers' Union. In 2010, a record $9.5 million ransom was paid to Somali pirates for the release of the Samho Dream, another vessel operated by the Samho Shipping Company.

=== 2011 hijacking ===
The Samho Jewelry was traveling from the United Arab Emirates to Sri Lanka when it was captured off the Somali coast by pirates on January 15, 2011. Tanker captain Seok Hae-gyun changed the ship's course to keep in international waters as long as possible. The crew of eight South Koreans, 11 Burmese and two Indonesians were held as hostages. The Norwegian government had been criticized for not being part of the anti-piracy effort and had no military presence in the area at the time. The Samho Shipping Company was facing huge losses because it was obliged to continue paying Acta under its charter even while the vessel was held by pirates. Though Samsung Fire & Marine Insurance and Green Insurance had insured the ship for up to $45 million, their reinsurance policy through the Korean Reinsurance company would not cover "war risk".

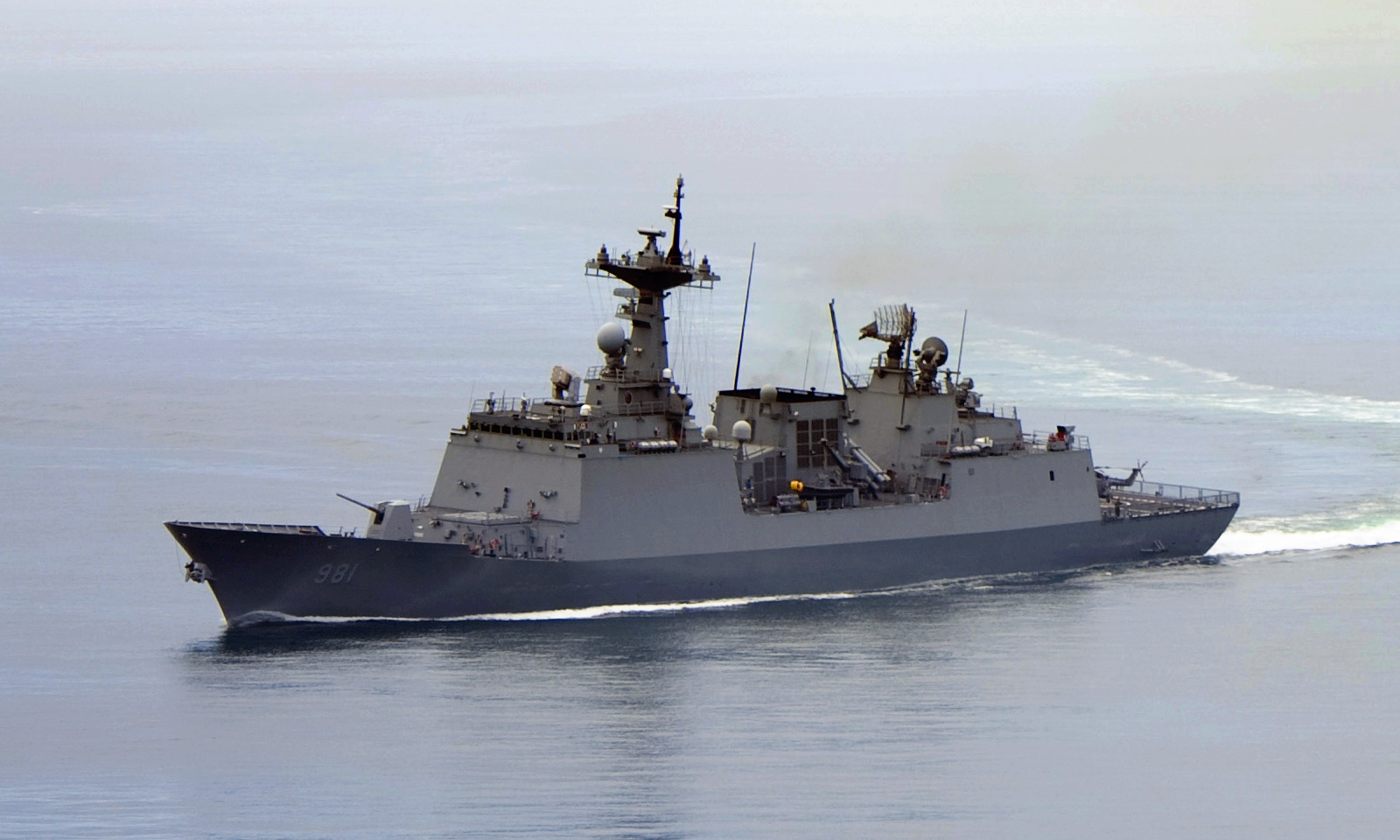
ROKS Choi Young

On January 16, 2011, South Korean President Lee Myung-bak issued an order to "comprehensively deal with" the crisis. The South Korean destroyer ROKS Choi Young was dispatched to the area to launch the operation, dubbed "Dawn of Gulf of Aden", at 9:58 am Korea Standard Time on January 21, 2011. ROK Navy commandos used a speed boat and ladders to climb aboard while a Westland Lynx helicopter and the destroyer provided covering fire. Once on board, the commandos fought a five-hour battle, going compartment to compartment in search of pirates. The pirates were found all over the ship, including in the board, pontoon and engine room. All 21 crew members were freed, though Seok, the captain, survived multiple gunshot wounds at close range by a pirate who was believed to be the leader. Seok had executed a risky plan to mix water into the ship's engine oil to disrupt its propulsion and slow it down. Chief officer Kim Doo-Chan stated that he had lost several teeth from being "trampled and beaten ... just for talking with our captain." Eight pirates were killed in the raid and five captured alive.

President Lee announced the successful rescue on the national television networks. In his address, he stated, "We will not tolerate any behavior that threatens the lives and safety of our people in the future." The Christian Science Monitor, among other political analysts, believe the operation and presidential address were intended as "a thinly veiled warning to Pyongyang that South Korean forces are prepared to fight." The South Korean government had been heavily criticized by citizens for a weak response to North Korean attacks in the past year including the ROKS Cheonan sinking and the Yeonpyeong bombing.

==== Aftermath ====
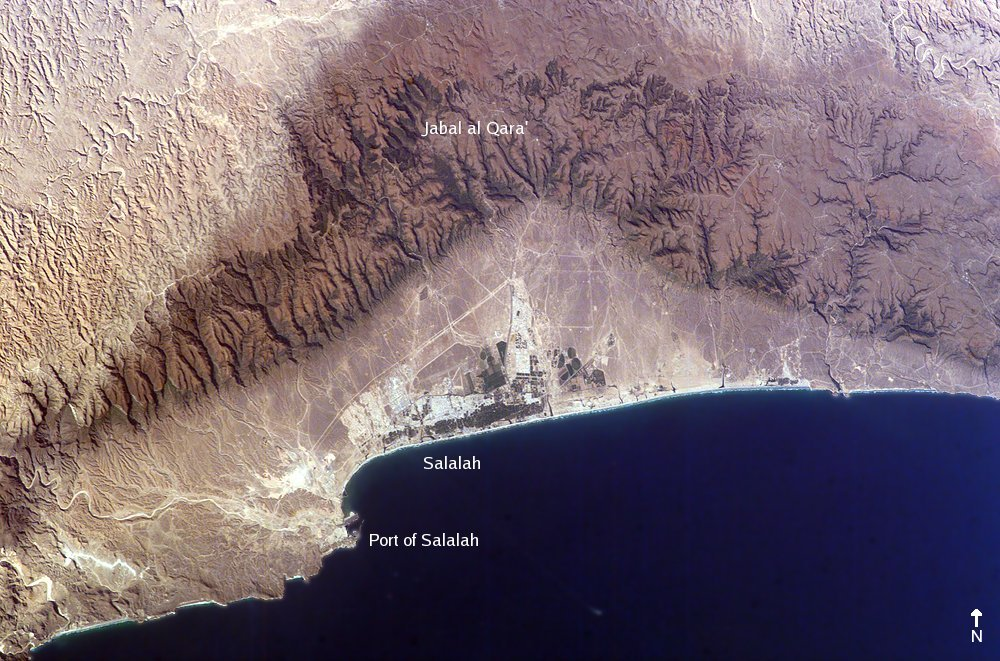
Aerial photo of Salalah

After the rescue, the Samho Jewelry headed for the Omani port of Salalah, where the crew was to receive medical checkups before being flown back to South Korea. Seok was stabilized after five hours of surgery at a hospital in Salalah. Local Korean workers donated blood on his behalf. On January 29, Seok was airlifted to Seoul Airbase in Seongnam. He underwent three additional hours of surgery at Ajou University Hospital. Ryu Hee-sug, the director of the hospital, stated that Seok's condition had deteriorated because of the onset of infection from six gunshot wounds: "Things could have taken a turn for the worse had he stayed in Oman for a few more days. It was an appropriate decision to bring him to Korea for the surgery." Seok has been called a hero for his actions during the hijacking. President Lee called the hospital to offer words of encouragement: "Many citizens have high expectations and are cheering [for you]."

The five captured pirates were flown to Seoul on January 29, and arrived in Busan on the next day for their upcoming trial. The defendants face charges of maritime robbery, attempted murder and ship hijacking. During interrogation, the pirates denied knowing one another nor who had shot the captain of the tanker, though investigators believe Arai Mahomed to be the gunman. The shooter would have been eligible for the death penalty if Seok had died. On February 2, the crew of the Samho Jewelry arrived at Gimhae International Airport in Busan, recounting that they had been violently beaten by the pirates and threatened with death. Chief engineer Chung Mann-Ki revealed that the crew had secretly sabotaged the tanker's systems, including the rudder, in an effort to thwart the pirates. Most of the crew members had been on the bridge when the commandos stormed the ship. Republic of Korea Coast Guard chief Kim Chung-kyu stated that the investigation found one of the bullets retrieved from Seok's body appeared to match that of the Navy, indicating that he had also been hit by friendly fire.

In response to the rescue operation, other pirates in Somalia claimed that they will kill any future Korean hostages and may have moved other Korean hostages off existing hijacked ships to inland locations.

== See also ==
- Cheonghae Unit
- Dai Hong Dan
- MV Maersk Alabama
- Operation Enduring Freedom – Horn of Africa
- List of ships attacked by Somali pirates in 2011
