= ROKS Dae Jo-yeong =

Chungmugong Yi Sun-sin-class destroyer

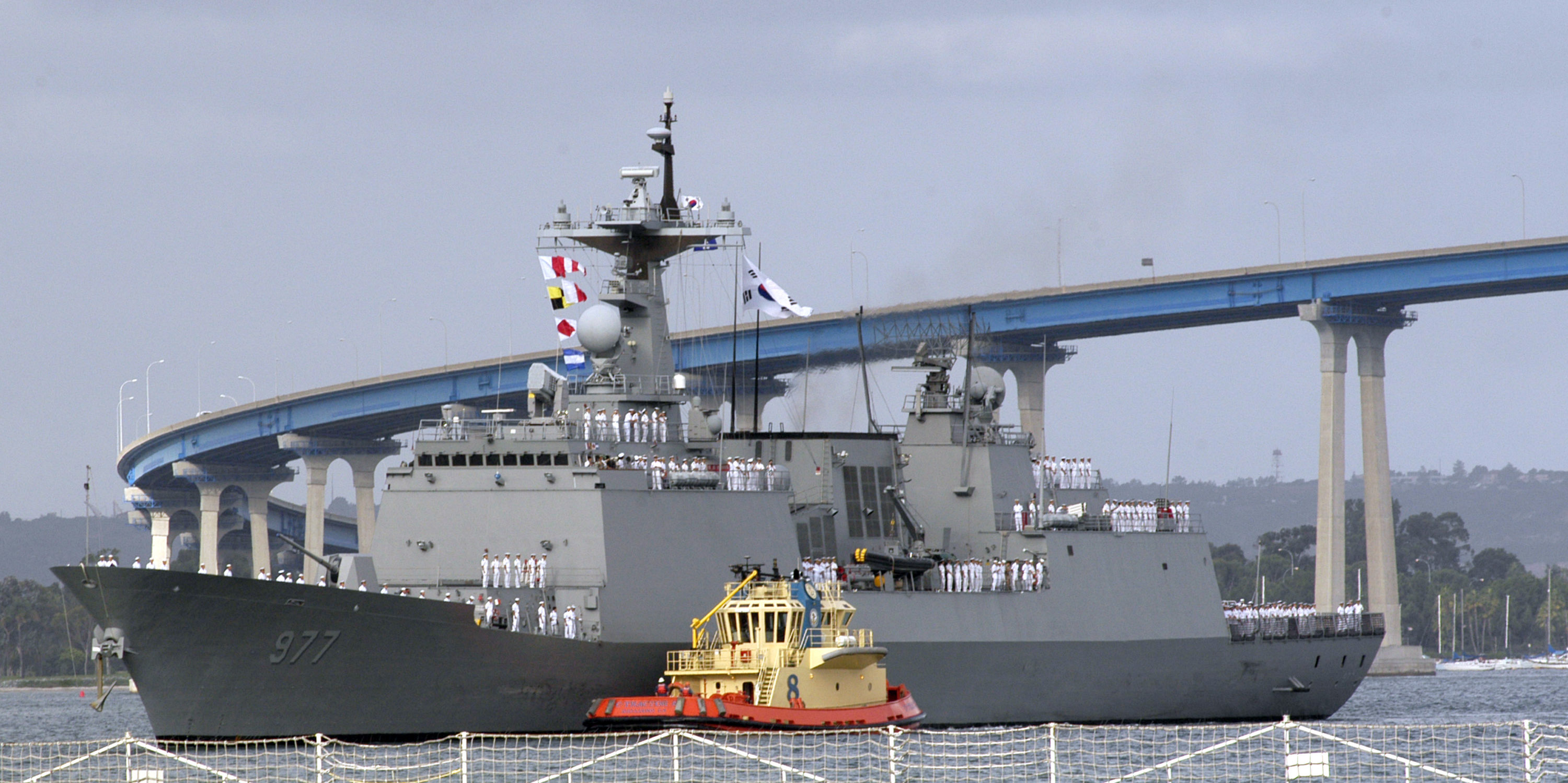
- ROKS Dae Jo-yeong passing under the Coronado Bridge, San Diego on 17 October 2006.

History

South Korea
- Name: Dae Jo-yeong; (대조영)
- Namesake: Dae Jo-yeong
- Builder: Daewoo Shipbuilding & Marine Engineering, South Korea
- Launched: 12 November 2003
- Commissioned: 30 June 2005
- Identification: Pennant number: DDH-977
- Status: Active

General characteristics
- Class & type: Chungmugong Yi Sun-sin-class destroyer
- Displacement: 4,800 t (4,700 long tons) standard; 5,000 t (4,900 long tons) full load
- Length: 150 m (492 ft 2 in)
- Beam: 17 m (55 ft 9 in)
- Propulsion: Combined diesel or gas
- Speed: 30 knots (56 km/h; 35 mph)
- Complement: 200
- Armament: 1 x 5"/54 caliber Mark 45 gun; 1 x Goalkeeper CIWS; 64 x VLS; 21 x RIM-116 Rolling Airframe Missile; 8 x RGM-84 Harpoon; 2 x triple K745 Blue Shark Torpedo

ROKS Dae Jo-yeong (DDH-977) is a Chungmugong Yi Sun-sin-class destroyer in the Republic of Korea Navy. She is named after Dae Jo-yeong.

== Design ==
The KDX-II is part of a much larger build up program aimed at turning the ROKN into a blue-water navy. It is said to be the first stealthy major combatant in the ROKN and was designed to significantly increase the ROKN's capabilities.

== Construction and career ==
ROKS Dae Jo-yeong was launched on 12 November 2003 by Daewoo Shipbuilding and commissioned on 30 June 2005.

=== RIMPAC 2018 ===
ROKS Dae Jo-yeong, ROKS Park Wi and ROKS Yulgok Yi I participated in RIMPAC 2018 which will last from 27 June to 2 August 2018.

== Gallery ==
ROKS Doe Jo-yeong Gallery

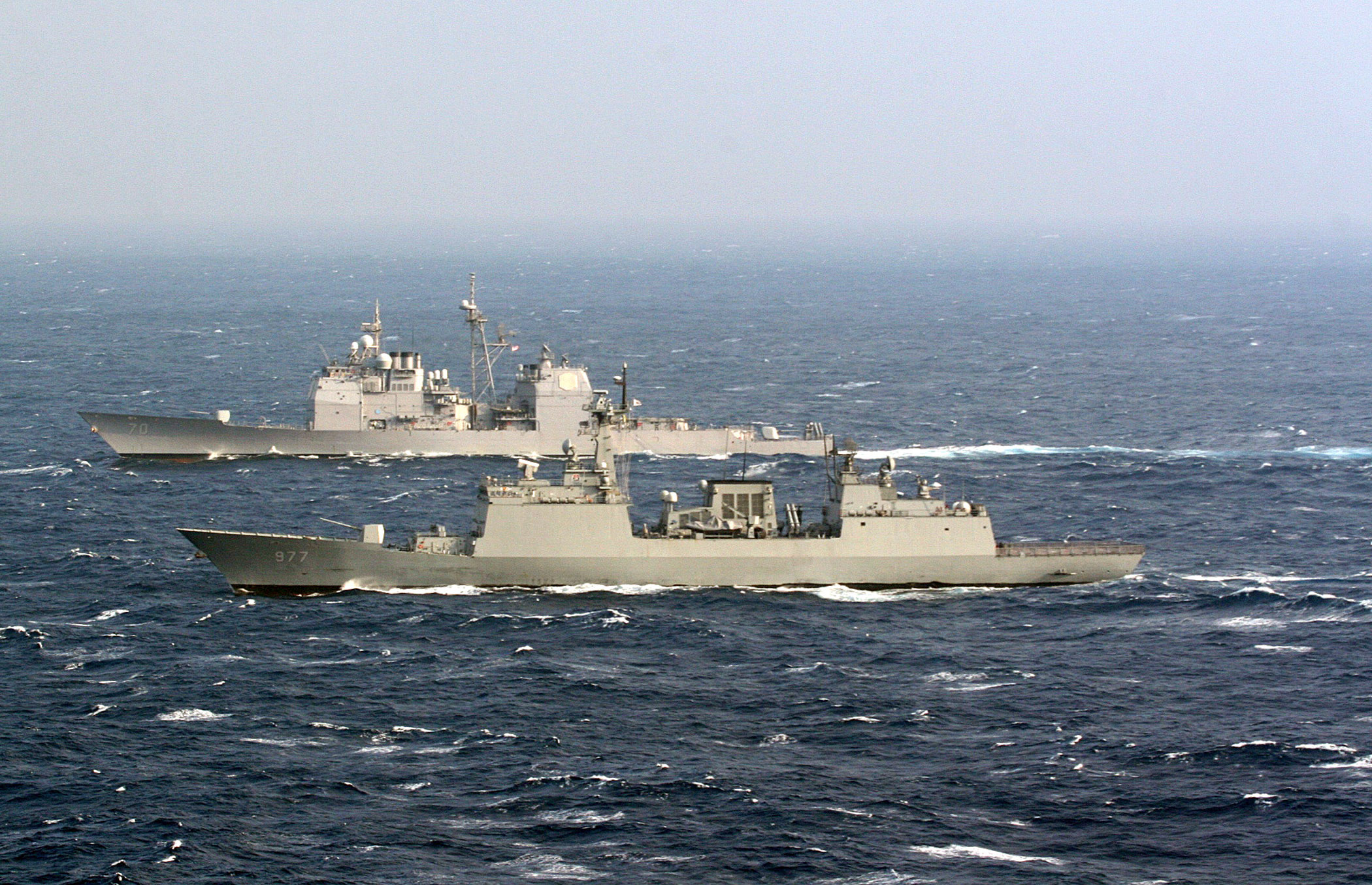
ROKS Doe Jo-yeong alongside USS Lake Erie during a communication drills and maneuvering stations on 13 January 2010.

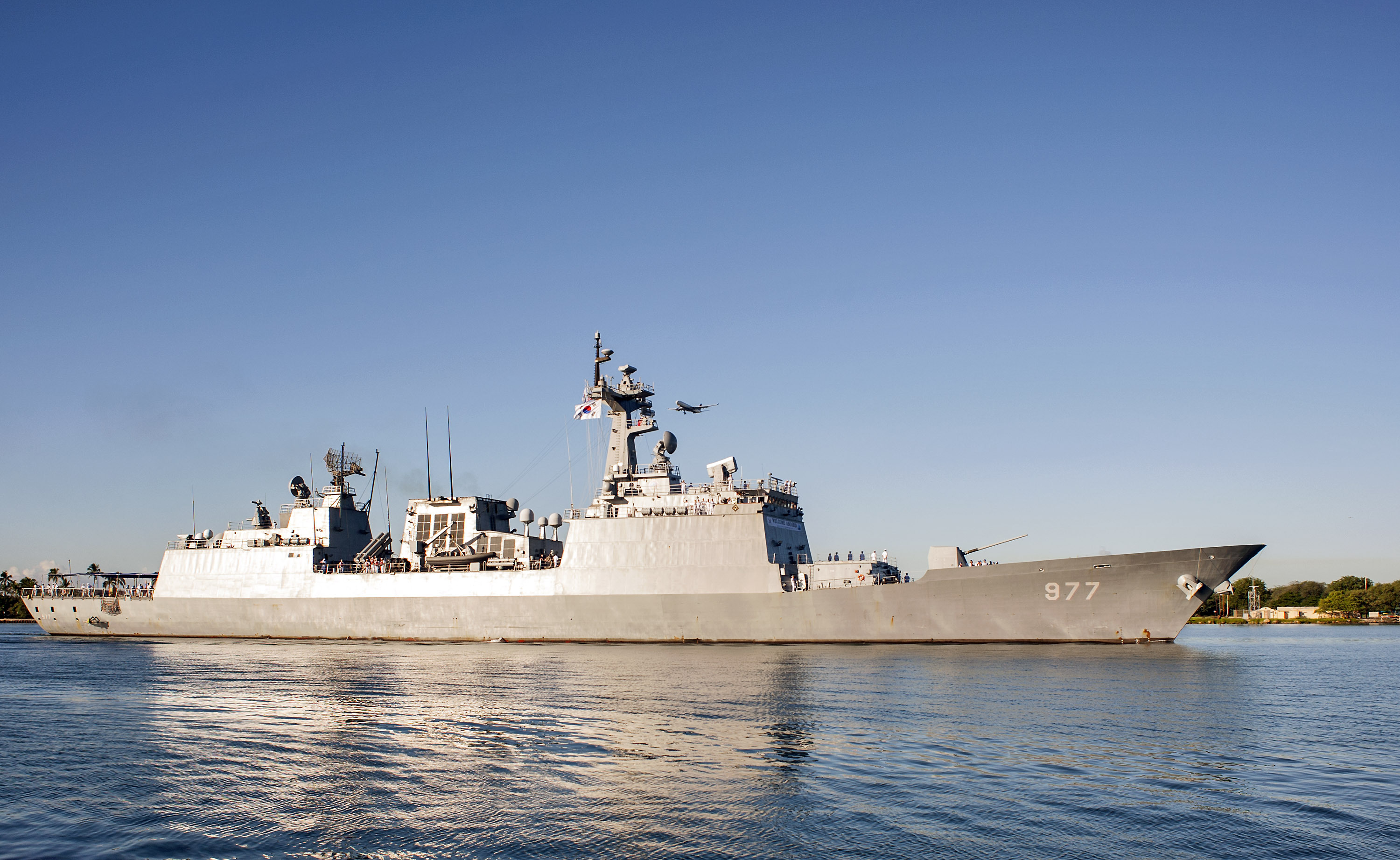
ROKS Dae Jo-yeong arriving in Pearl Harbor for the National Memorial Cemetery of the Pacific on 22 November 2013.

USS Ashland transits the East China Sea with ROKS Dae Jo-yeong during a photo exercise March 27, 2014.
