= MV Irene SL =

History
- Name: MV Irene SL
- Owner: First Navigational Special Maritime Enterprise, Greece
- Operator: Enesel S. A., Greece
- Port of registry: Piraeus, Greece
- Route: Fujairah to United States
- Builder: Hyundai Heavy Industries, South Korea
- Launched: 19 July 2004
- Completed: 2004
- Identification: Call sign: SVXS; IMO number: 9285823; MMSI number: 240247000

General characteristics
- Tonnage: 161,175 GT; 319,247 DWT
- Length: 330 m (1,082 ft 8 in)
- Beam: 60 m (196 ft 10 in)
- Draft: 22.5 m (73 ft 10 in)
- Propulsion: Diesel engine, 29,348 kW
- Speed: 15.7 knots (29.1 km/h; 18.1 mph)
- Capacity: 353,328 m3
- Crew: 25 (February 2011)

MT Irene SL is a Greek-owned and -operated VLCC (Very Large Crude Carrier) or supertanker. It was pirated presumably by Somali pirates on February 9, 2011 approximately 350 miles Southeast of Muscat, Oman in the Arabian Sea.

Built in 2004, the Irene SL has a gross tonnage of 161,175 GT with a displacement of 319,247 DWT. It is 330 metres (1,080 ft) long, has a beam of 60 metres (200 ft) and a draft of 22.5 metres (74 ft). The vessel has a single deck and is double-hulled. Her sister ship is the 2005-built MV Argenta.

When captured the ship was en route from Fujairah to the United States loaded with 2 million barrels of crude oil with an estimated value of $200 million. The ship was captured one day after the pirates took control of another tanker, the MV Savina Caylin. With the use of larger mother ships since the end of 2010, pirates have extended their operational capabilities.

Three other VLCCs that have been ransomed by pirates are the Sirius Star, the Maran Centaurus, and the Samho Dream.

== See also ==
- List of ships attacked by Somali pirates in 2011
