= ROKS Choe Yeong =

Chungmugong Yi Sun-sin-class destroyer

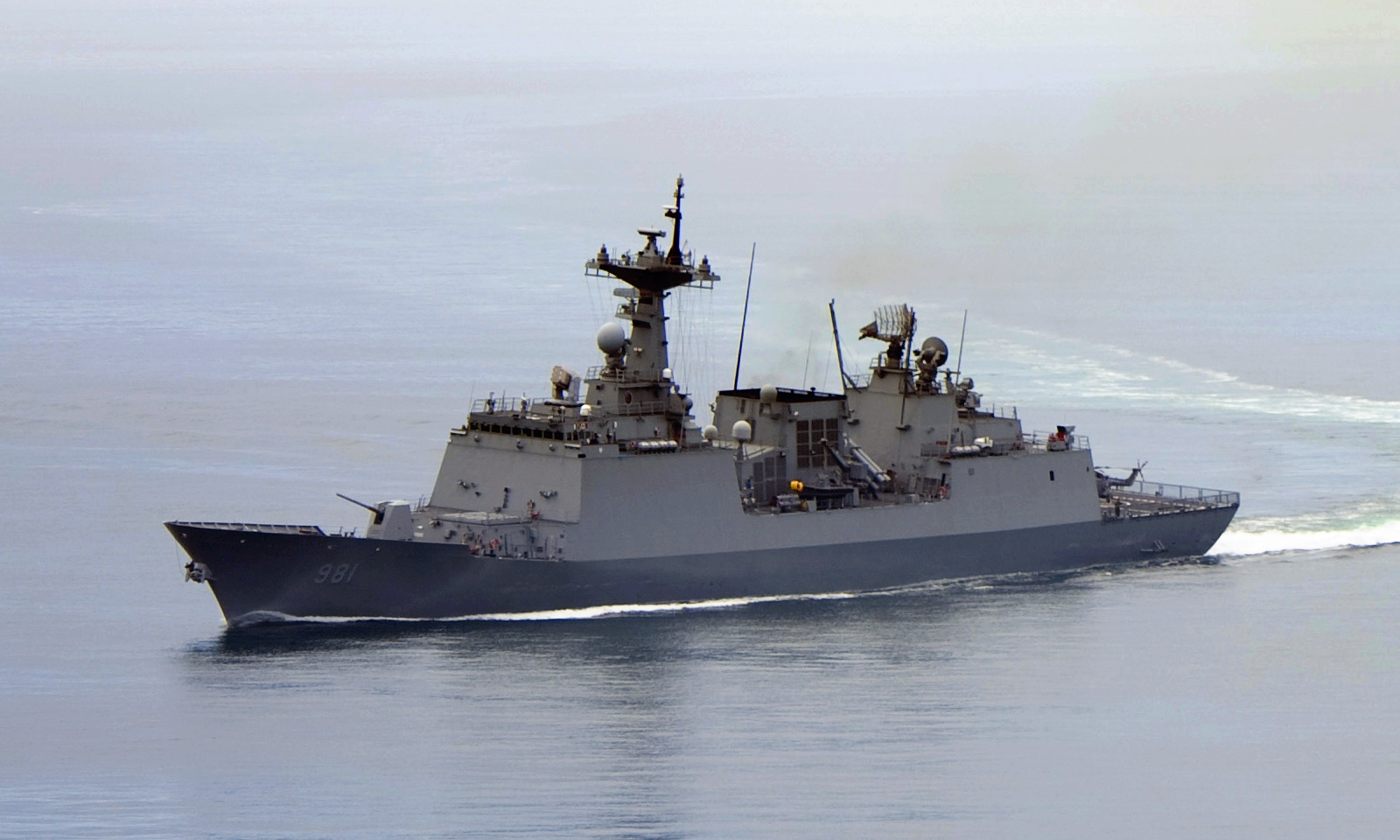
- ROKS Choe Yeong

History

South Korea
- Name: Choe Yeong; (최영)
- Namesake: Choe Yeong
- Builder: Hyundai
- Launched: 20 October 2006
- Commissioned: 4 September 2008
- Identification: Pennant number: DDH-981
- Motto: Do Your Best, Be The First
- Status: Active
- Badge

General characteristics
- Class & type: Chungmugong Yi Sun-sin-class destroyer
- Displacement: 4,400 t (4,300 long tons) standard; 5,520 t (5,430 long tons) full load
- Length: 150 m (492 ft 2 in)
- Beam: 17.4 m (57 ft 1 in)
- Draft: 9.5 m (31 ft 2 in)
- Propulsion: Combined diesel or gas
- Speed: 30 knots (56 km/h; 35 mph)
- Range: 10,200 km (5,500 nmi)
- Complement: 200
- Armament: 1 x 5"/54 caliber Mark 45 gun; 1 x Goalkeeper CIWS; 64 x VLS; 21 x RIM-116 Rolling Airframe Missile; 8 x RGM-84 Harpoon; 2 x triple K745 Blue Shark Torpedo

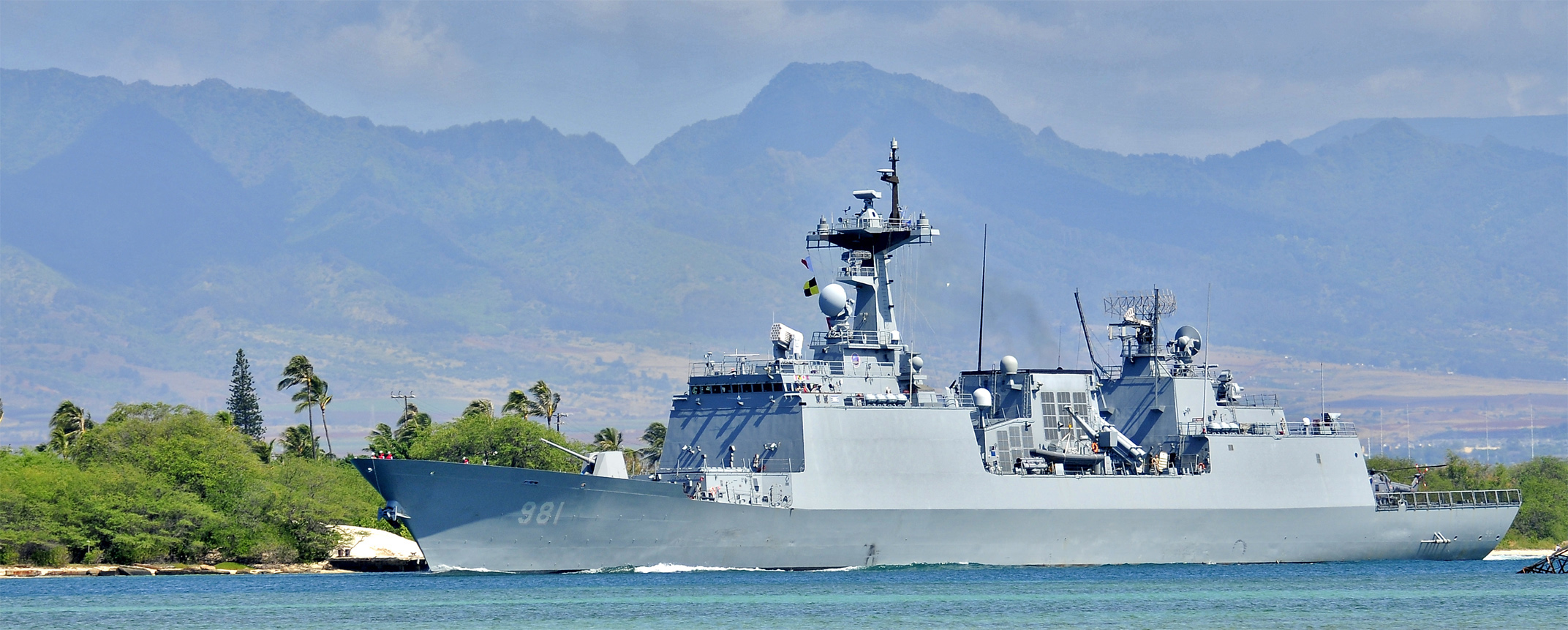
Choe Yeong departs Joint Base Pearl Harbor–Hickam during Rim of the Pacific 2012

ROKS Choe Yeong is a Chungmugong Yi Sun-sin-class destroyer in the South Korean navy. The ship is named after Choe Yeong.

In January 2011 she saw action when she pursued a chemical tanker captured by Somali pirates. The tanker was retaken with eight pirates killed and five captured. Later in 2011 she evacuated South Korean nationals stranded in Libya.

== Design ==
The KDX-II is part of a much larger build up program aimed at turning the ROKN into a blue-water navy. It is said to be the first stealthy major combatant in the ROKN and was designed to significantly increase the ROKN's capabilities.

== Construction and career ==
ROKS Choe Yeong is a Chungmugong Yi Sun-sin-class destroyer and entered service in 2006.

Choe Yeong was assigned to patrol the Northern Limit Line in November 2009 after a boundary dispute clash with North Korea, the first of its kind in seven years. In August 2010, the ship participated in a series of naval drills in the Yellow Sea, four months after the sinking of ROKS Cheonan.

=== 2011 rescue operation ===
On 15 January 2011, the Norwegian-owned chemical tanker Samho Jewelry was captured by Somali pirates while en route from the United Arab Emirates to Sri Lanka. The South Korean operator of the vessel, the Samho Shipping Company, was facing huge losses because it was obligated to continue paying Norwegian investors under its charter even while the vessel was held by pirates. However, the Norwegian government had no military presence in the area at the time. Eight South Koreans were among the 21 crewmembers being held hostage.

The South Korean government dispatched Choe Yeong, under Captain Cho Young-joo, commander of the Cheonghae Anti-piracy Unit. Choe Yeong pursued Samho Jewelry for nearly a week until the pirates aboard the tanker were fatigued. Several fake attacks were staged to exhaust the pirate crew. When some of the pirates left the ship to attempt another hijacking on a nearby Mongolian vessel, commandos from the Republic of Korea Naval Special Warfare Brigade boarded Samho Jewelry while a Westland Lynx helicopter provided covering fire. Communications jamming was utilized to prevent the pirates from calling for assistance. The tanker was retaken with eight pirates killed and five captured. The captain of Samho Jewelry survived a gunshot wound to the stomach while three navy personnel suffered "light scratches". The rest of the tanker crew were unharmed.

Choe Yeong escorted Samho Jewelry to Oman, where they docked at the port of Muscat on 31 January. The rescue was called "a perfect military operation" by Lieutenant General Lee Sung-ho of the Joint Chiefs of Staff of the Republic of Korea.

=== 2011 Libya evacuation ===
ROKS Choe Yeong was diverted from anti-piracy operations in the waters off of Somalia to evacuate South Korean nationals stranded in Libya. Choe Yeong successfully evacuated 32 South Korean nationals on 4 March and docked in the Maltese port of Valletta. Choe Yeong remained on standby near Libyan waters to support "further evacuation efforts."

=== 2019 Jinhae Accident ===
ROKS Choe Yeong returned from a tour of duty with the Cheonghae Anti-piracy Unit on 24 May 2019. The ship was participating in a welcoming ceremony in the Jinhae Naval Base in Jinhae. While tightening a mooring line around 10:15 am KST, the rope snapped for currently unknown reasons. A petty officer second class died while receiving treatment, while four other sailors received non-life-threatening injuries.

=== 2021 Strait of Hormuz Incident ===
The ROKS Choe Yeong was deployed to the Strait of Hormuz after Iranian maritime forces belonging to the IRGC seized a South Korean-flagged vessel.

== See also ==
- Korean Destroyer eXperimental
- List of Republic of Korea Navy ships
