= Chungmugong Yi Sun-sin-class destroyer =

Class of South Korean destroyers

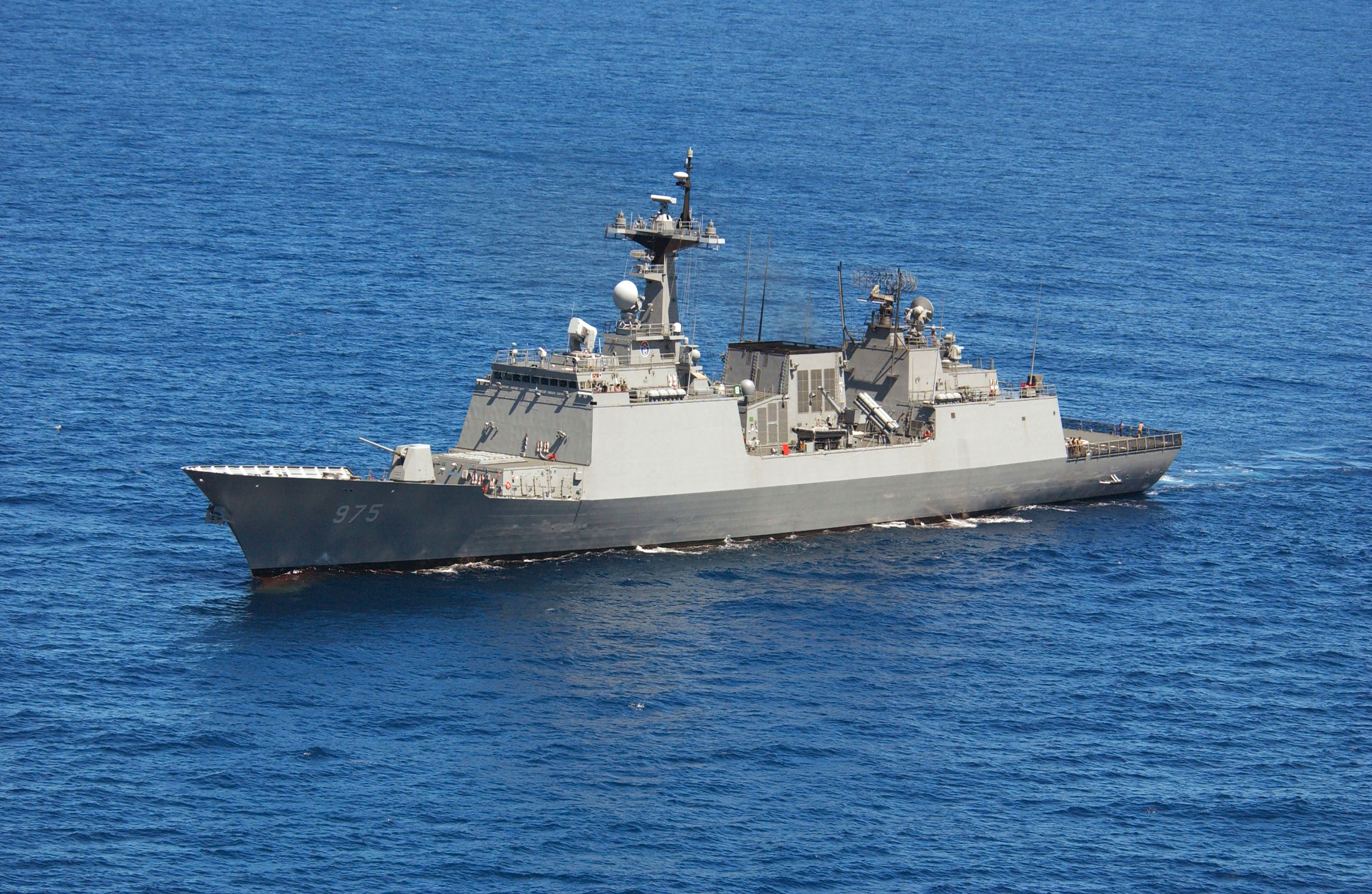
- ROKS Yi SunSin (DDH-975)

Class overview
- Builders: Hyundai Heavy Industries; Daewoo Shipbuilding & Marine Engineering
- Operators: Republic of Korea Navy
- Preceded by: Gwanggaeto the Great class
- Succeeded by: Sejong the Great class
- Built: 2002-2006
- In commission: 2003–
- Active: 6

General characteristics
- Type: Destroyer
- Displacement: 5,500 tonnes (5,413 long tons) standard; 6,520 tonnes (6,417 long tons) full load
- Length: 150 m (492 ft 2 in)
- Beam: 17.4 m (57 ft 1 in)
- Draft: 9.5 m (31 ft 2 in)
- Propulsion: Hanhwa GE LM2500, Doosan MTU 956 Combined diesel or gas
- Speed: 30 knots (56 km/h; 35 mph)
- Complement: 300
- Armament: 1 × 5 inch (127 mm)/L62 caliber Mk 45 Mod 4 naval gun; 1 × 30 mm Goalkeeper CIWS; 1 × RAM Block 1 CIWS; 8 × SSM-700K Haeseong Anti-ship Missiles; 32-cell Mk 41 VLS for SM-2 Block IIIA; 24-cell K-VLS for: K-ASROC Red Shark; Hyunmoo III land attack cruise missiles
- Aircraft carried: 2 × Super Lynx helicopters
- Notes: Wang Geon is currently (April 2015) acting in a NEO/Temporary diplomatic mission role on station off the coast of Yemen. She was originally in the area as part of the Cheonghae Unit rotation.

Chungmugong Yi Sun-sin class destroyers (Korean: 충무공 이순신급 구축함, Hanja: 忠武公李舜臣級驅逐艦) are multipurpose destroyers of the Republic of Korea Navy. The lead ship of this class, ROKS Chungmugong Yi Sunsin, was launched in May 2002 and commissioned in December 2003. Chungmugong Yi Sun-sin-class destroyers were the second class of ships to be produced in the Republic of Korea Navy's destroyer mass-production program named Korean Destroyer eXperimental, which paved the way for the navy to become a blue-water navy. Six ships were launched by Hyundai Heavy Industries and Daewoo Shipbuilding & Marine Engineering in four years.

== Weapon systems ==
The ships have a 32-cell strike-length Mk 41 VLS for SM-2 Block IIIA area-air defence missiles, one 21-round RAM inner-layer defence missile launcher, one 30 mm Goalkeeper close-in weapon system, one Mk 45 Mod 4 127 mm gun, eight Harpoon anti-ship missiles and two triple 324 mm anti-submarine torpedo tubes.

The electronics suite includes one Raytheon AN/SPS-49(V)5 2D long-range radar (LRR), one Thales Nederland MW08 target indication 3D radar (TIR), two Thales Nederland STIR240 fire-control radars with OT-134A Continuous Wave Illumination (CWI) transmitters, an SLQ-200(V)K SONATA electronic warfare system and a KDCOM-II combat management system (BAe SEMA SSCS Mk.7) which is derived from the Royal Navy Type 23 frigate's SSCS combat management system using technology provided by BAeSEMA, naval technology joint venture between British Aerospace and the French Sema Group. BAE Systems WDS Mk 14 originally developed for the US Navy's New Threat Upgrade evaluates threats, prioritizes them, and engages them in order with SM-2.

On the 4th unit, ROKS Wang Geon, the 32-cell Mk 41 VLS is moved to the left and an indigenous VLS named K-VLS is installed on the right. The ship's forward part is spacious enough to take a 56-cell Mk 41 VLS.

== KDX-II Product Improvement Project ==
The KDX-II Product Improvement Project (PIP) is planned to address several deficiences. This includes obsolescence of foreign imported components such as the combat information system resulting in low availability and frequent unplanned shutdowns, and the limited performance of key systems such as Thales Nederland MW08 radar.

On Jun 14, 2024, the Defense Acquisition Program Administration (DAPA) issued a bid announcement to start the selection of a shipyard for the KDX-II PIP. The project is scheduled to be completed by December 2033, with a budget of KRW 470 billion. The major statement of work is expected to include replacing the hull mounted sonar, towed array sonar system, MW08 3D radar and the combat information system.

== Design ==
The KDX-II is part of a much larger build up program aimed at turning the ROKN into a blue-water navy. It is said to be the first stealthy major combatant in the ROKN and was designed to significantly increase the ROKN's capabilities.

== Ships in the class ==
Name	Pennant number	Builder	Launched	Commissioned	Status
ROKS Chungmugong Yi Sun-sin	DDH-975	Daewoo Shipbuilding & Marine Engineering	15 May 2002	30 November 2003	Active
ROKS Munmu the Great	DDH-976	Hyundai Heavy Industries	11 April 2003	30 September 2004	Active
ROKS Dae Jo-yeong	DDH-977	Daewoo Shipbuilding & Marine Engineering	12 November 2003	30 June 2005	Active
ROKS Wang Geon	DDH-978	Hyundai Heavy Industries	4 May 2005	10 November 2006	Active
ROKS Gang Gam-chan	DDH-979	Daewoo Shipbuilding & Marine Engineering	16 March 2006	1 October 2007	Active
ROKS Choe Yeong	DDH-981	Hyundai Heavy Industries	20 October 2006	4 September 2008	Active

== Gallery ==
Chungmugong Yi Sun-sin-class Gallery

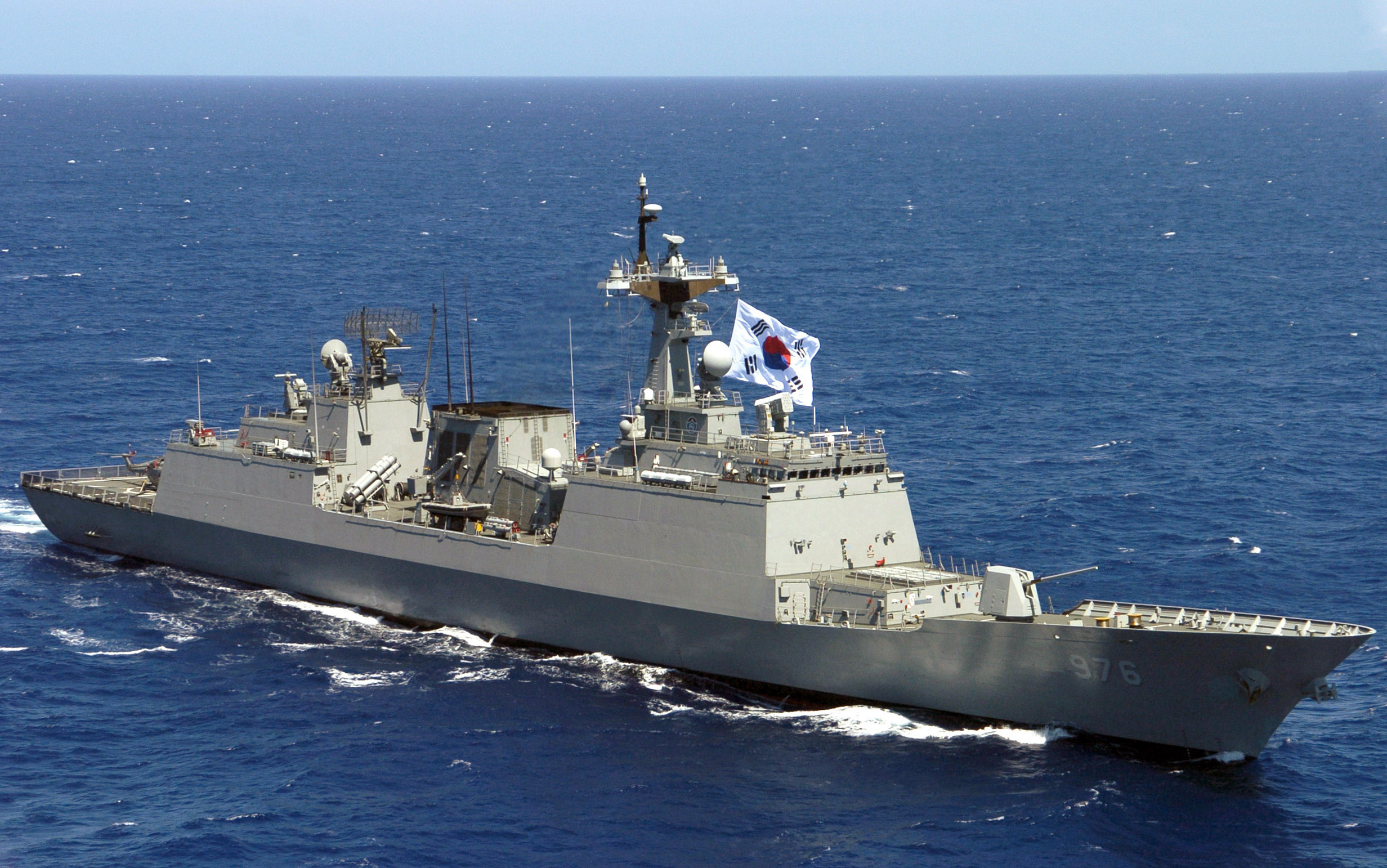
ROKS Munmu the Great (DDH-976) during RIMPAC 2006

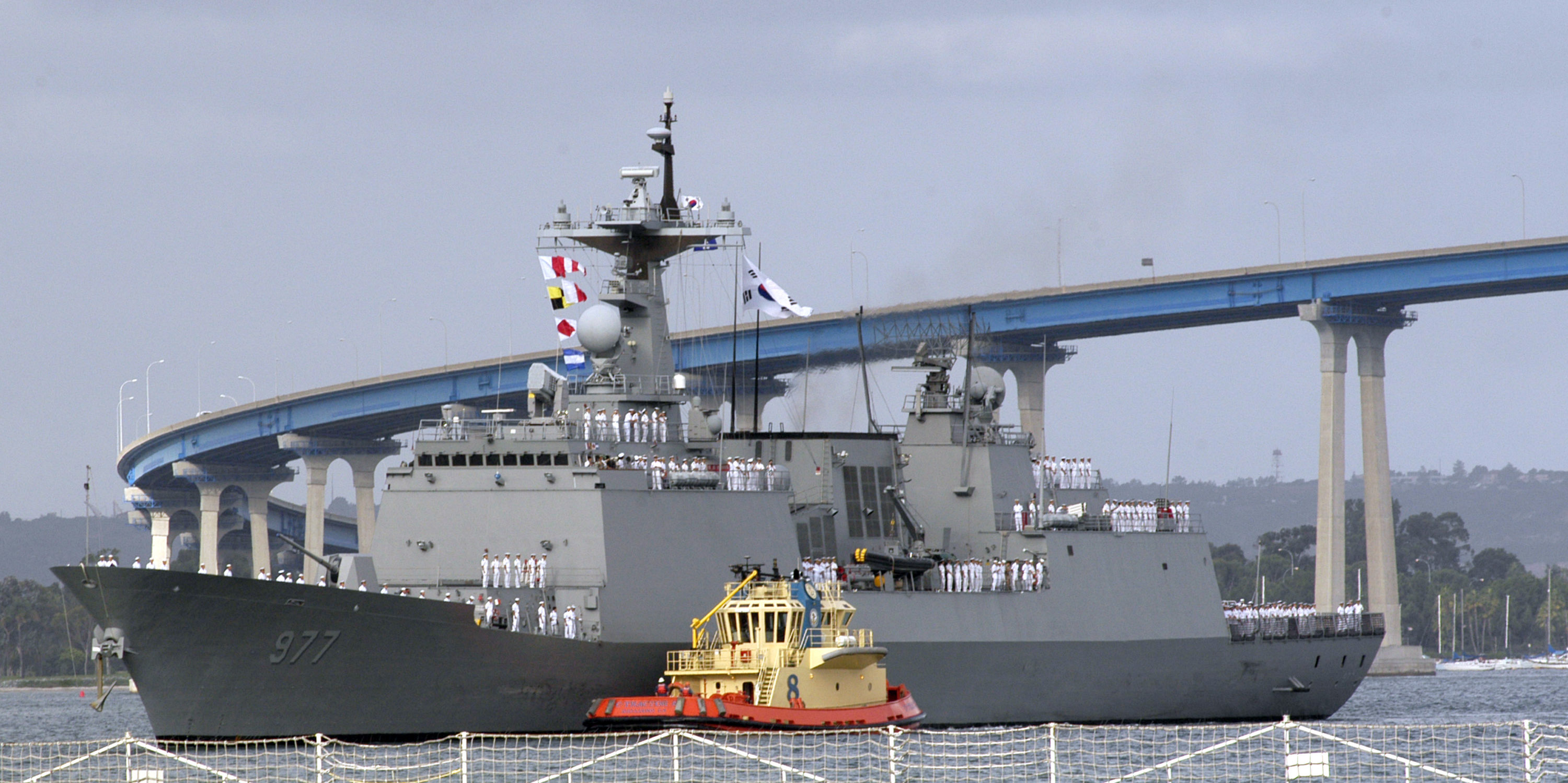
ROKS Dae Jo Yeong (DDH-977) being guided into Naval Base San Diego

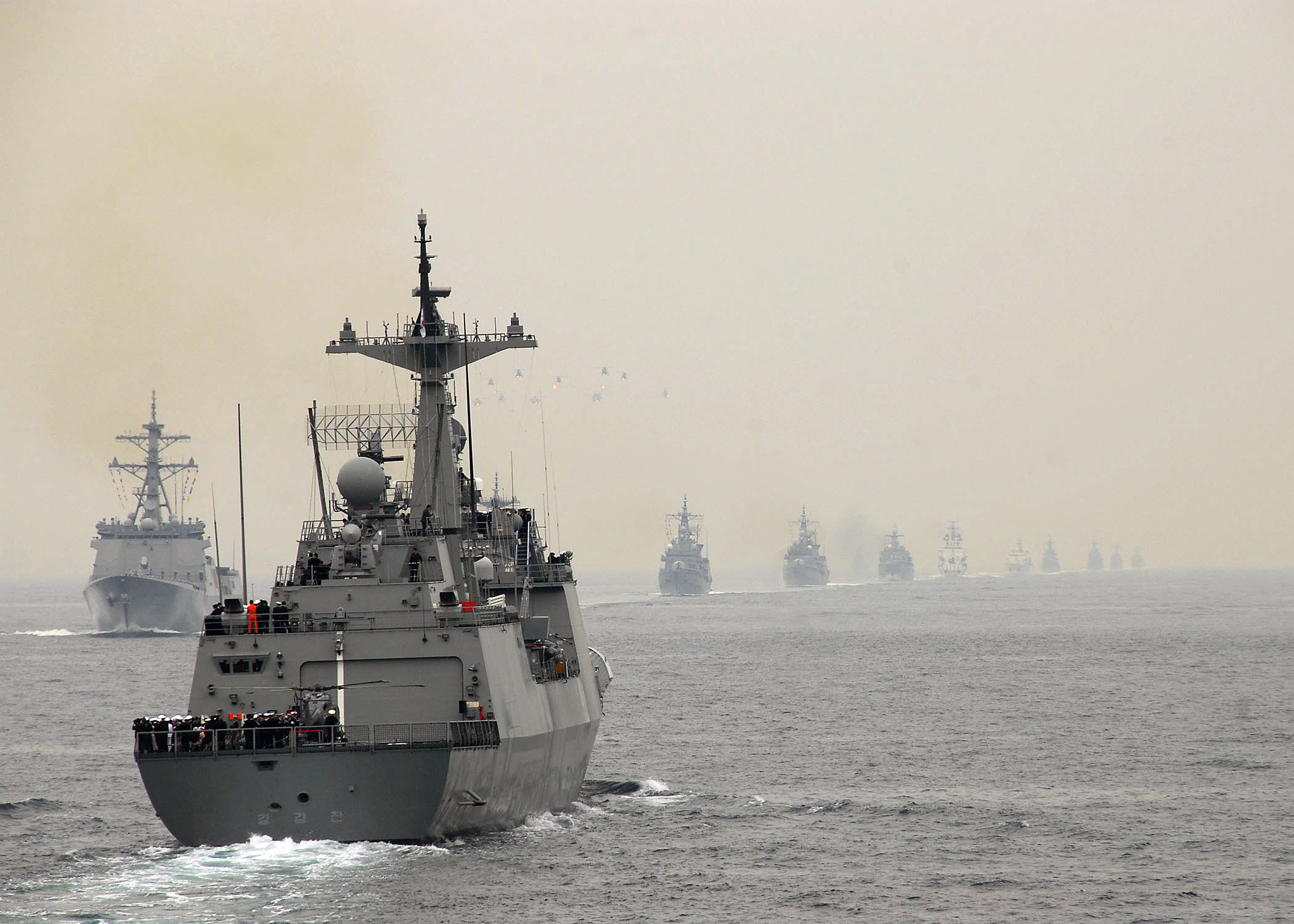
ROKS Kang Gamchan (DDH-979) during International Fleet Review

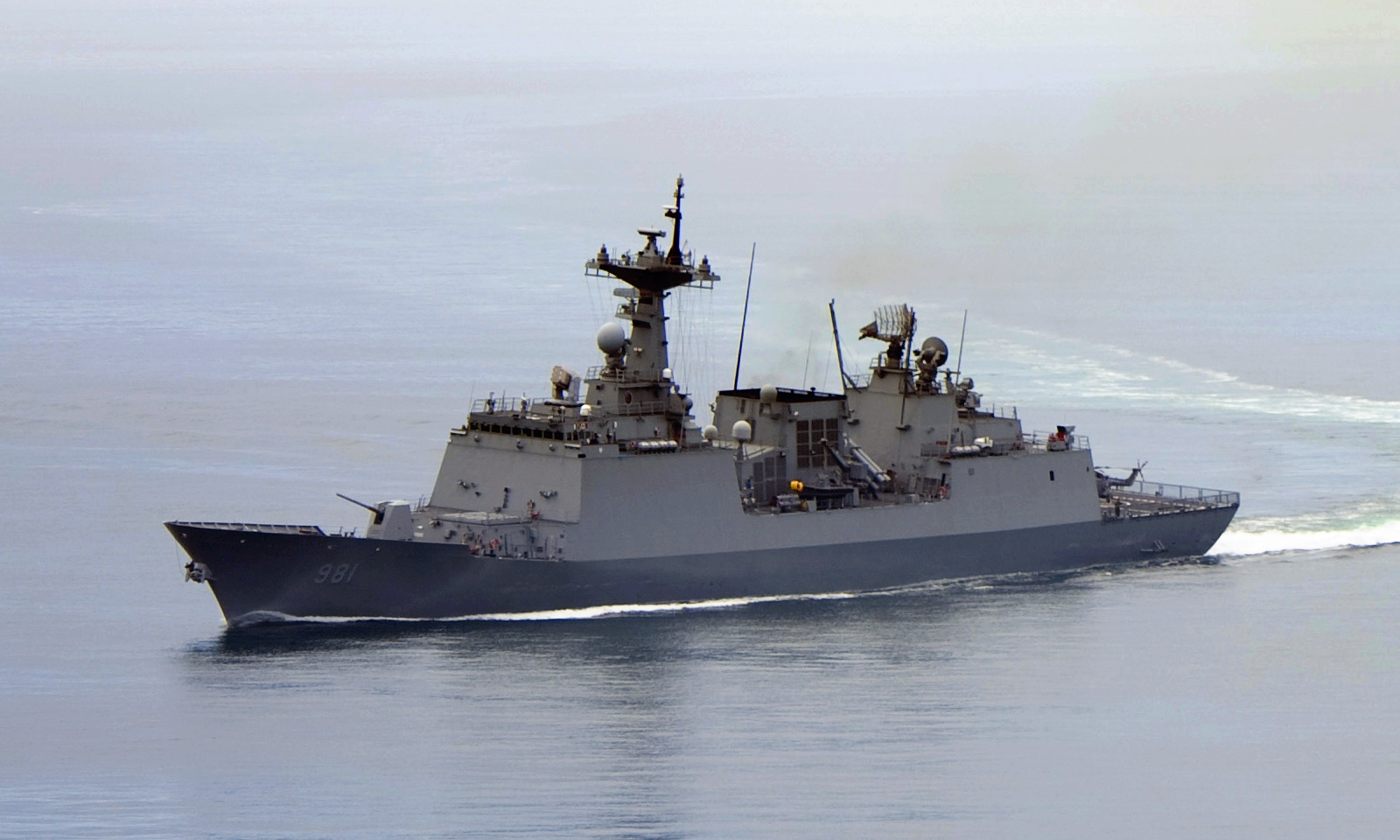
ROKS Choi Young (DDH-981) during joint exercise "Invincible Spirit"

== Variants ==
=== KDX-IIA ===
KDX-IIA is a proposed variant of the KDX-II. It will be armed with the advanced Aegis Combat System and will have enhanced features of KDX-II such as stealth. The ship has been offered to the Indian Navy.

=== Arsenal ship ===
On August 14, 2019, the Ministry of National Defense unveiled a five-year defense plan between 2020 and 2024. The defense plan called for two new naval projects to be developed: the LPX-II-Class Aircraft Carrier and an arsenal ship. The design of the arsenal ship is said to be based on the KDX-II destroyer and is expected to be completed by the late 2020s.

== See also ==
- List of destroyer classes in service

Equivalent destroyers of the same era

- Takanami class
- Type 051C
