= MV Samho Dream =

History
- Name: Samho Dream
- Owner: SH Tankers Limited
- Operator: Samho Shipping Co., LTD
- Port of registry: Marshall Islands
- Launched: 29 September 2002
- Identification: IMO number: 9235737; MMSI number: 229780000; Callsign: 9HA3602

General characteristics
- Class & type: VLCC
- Tonnage: 319,360 SDWT
- Length: 332.99 M
- Beam: 60.05 M
- Crew: 24

Samho Dream is a South Korean, Marshall-Island flagged supertanker that was carrying oil from Iraq to the United States when it was hijacked by Somali pirates on April 4, 2010. At the time, the vessel was crewed by 24 sailors: five South Koreans and nineteen Filipinos. The owner of the craft, Korea-based SH Tankers Limited said a pirate source named Mohamed had said the ship was heading for Haradheere, the pirates' base at which many ships are held during ransom negotiations. On November 6, 2010, after being held for 217 days, the ship was released from under pirate control for a ransom of about $9 million.

Three other VLCCs that have been ransomed by pirates are the Sirius Star, the Maran Centaurus, and the Irene SL.

The VLCC was arrested on its arrival in Hong Kong on 18 October 2011. Admiralty judge Justice Anselmo Reyes ordered that the ship be sold over the non-payment of bank loans, according to the South China Morning Post, as Samho Shipping filed for bankruptcy protection after the Busan-based company ran out of cash.

The Samho Dream was built in 2002, and has been renamed Skopelos by its new owners.

== See also ==
- List of ships attacked by Somali pirates
- MV Samho Jewelry
