= List of ships attacked by Somali pirates in 2011 =

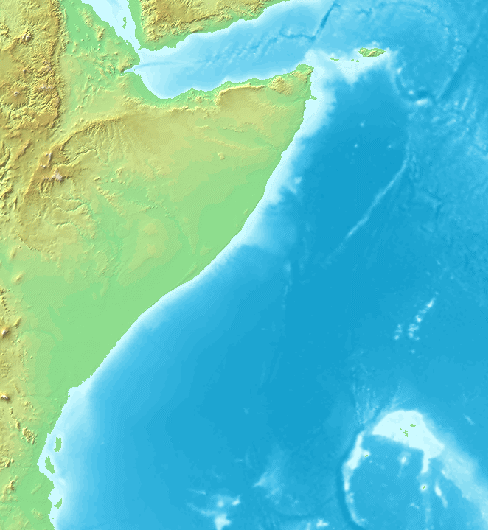
General area off the coast of Somalia where the pirates operate

Somali pirates have threatened international shipping with piracy since the beginning of the Somali Civil War in the early 1990s. This list documents those ships attacked in 2011: for other years, see List of ships attacked by Somali pirates.

== January ==
Image	Flag (owner)	Name (class)	Crew (cargo)	Status	Date of attack	Coordinates
Image	Flag (owner)	Name (class)	Crew (cargo)	Status	Date of release	Ransom demanded
	Algeria	MV Blida (Cargo ship)	17 (Cement)	Released	2011-01-01	unknown
	Algeria	MV Blida (Cargo ship)	17 (Cement)	Released	2011-11-03	yes
Blida was captured in the Arabian Sea 3:30 pm local time off the coast of Oman.
	Denmark	MV Leopard (Cargo ship)	6 (Arms & Ammo)	Released	2011-01-12	unknown
	Denmark	MV Leopard (Cargo ship)	6 (Arms & Ammo)	Released	2013-04-30	Yes
Leopard was attacked evening 12 Jan in Arabian Sea off Oman and found abandoned 13 Jan EUNAVFOR believes Somali pirates transferred all 6 crew to Taiwanese F/V Shiuh Fu No. 1, itself captured by pirates 25 December 2010.
	Malaysia (Japan)	MV Bunga Laurel (Cargo ship)	23 (Lubricating oil & Ethylene dichloride)	Rescued by Malaysian Navy	2011-01-20	unknown
	Malaysia (Japan)	MV Bunga Laurel (Cargo ship)	23 (Lubricating oil & Ethylene dichloride)	Rescued by Malaysian Navy	2011-01-20	not known
When Malaysian Navy PASKALs stormed the Japanese-owned cargo ship, seven pirates were captured and none of the hostages were harmed. The seven Somali pirates are brought to Malaysia and faced sentences of four to seven years in prison.
	Malta (South Korea)	Samho Jewelry (Tanker)	21 (Chemicals)	Rescued by Korean Navy	2011-01-15	unknown
	Malta (South Korea)	Samho Jewelry (Tanker)	21 (Chemicals)	Rescued by Korean Navy	2011-01-21	not known
When South Korean commandos stormed (ROKN UDT/SEALS) the South Korean Hyundai Samho Heavy Industries ship, eight pirates were killed and none of the captured crew died.
	Mongolia (Vietnam)	MV Hoang Son Sun (Cargo ship)	24 (Cattle feed)	Released	2011-01-21	unknown
	Mongolia (Vietnam)	MV Hoang Son Sun (Cargo ship)	24 (Cattle feed)	Released	2011-09-15	US$4.5 million
Attacked approximately 520 nautical miles south east of the port of Omani capital Muscat.
	Antigua and Barbuda (Germany)	MV Beluga Nomination (Cargo ship)	12 ()	Captured	2011-01-22	unknown
	Antigua and Barbuda (Germany)	MV Beluga Nomination (Cargo ship)	12 ()	Captured	2011-04-13	$5 million
Safety room opened after 2 days; attacked approximately 800 nautical miles north of the Seychelles Islands. On 27 January 2011 a Danish naval vessel and a patrol boat from the Seychelles reached the Beluga Nomination. A firefight erupted, leading to fatalities. Two seamen escaped during the confusion and were rescued, but the Beluga Nomination remained in pirate control.
	Liberia (Germany)	MV New York Star (Tanker)	unknown (Naphtha)	attacked twice, rescued	2011-01-28	unknown
	Liberia (Germany)	MV New York Star (Tanker)	unknown (Naphtha)	attacked twice, rescued	2011-01-29	no
Attacked about 523nm NW of Kavaratti island; pirates boarded, but were unable to break into the citadel to seize control of the ship, and had fled by the time naval forces arrived.
	Bahamas	CMA CGM Verdi (Container)	unknown (unknown)	Attempted attack prevented by the Indian Navy and the Indian Coast Guard	2011-01-29	unknown
	Bahamas	CMA CGM Verdi (Container)	unknown (unknown)	Attempted attack prevented by the Indian Navy and the Indian Coast Guard	2011-01-29	no
An Indian Coast Guard aircraft while responding to a distress call from the CMA CGM Verdi, located two skiffs attempting a piracy attack near Lakshadweep. Seeing the aircraft, the skiffs immediately aborted their piracy attempt and dashed towards the mother vessel, MV Prantalay – a hijacked Thai trawler, which hurriedly hoisted the two skiffs onboard and moved westward. The Indian Navy deployed the INS Cankarso which located and engaged the mothership 100 nautical miles north of the Minicoy island. 10 pirates were killed while 15 were apprehended and 20 Thai and Myanmar fishermen being held aboard the ship as hostages were rescued. INS Cankarso was subsequently joined by the INS Kalpeni of the Indian Navy and CGS Sankalp of the Indian Coast Guard. The rescued fishermen were sent to Kochi while the 15 pirates, mostly Somali, have been taken to Mumbai. Mumbai Police have confirmed that they have registered a case against the pirates for attempt to murder and various other provisions under the Indian Penal Code and Foreigners Act for entering the Indian waters without permission.

== February ==
Image	Flag (owner)	Name (class)	Crew (cargo)	Status	Date of attack	Coordinates
Image	Flag (owner)	Name (class)	Crew (cargo)	Status	Date of release	Ransom demanded
	Italy	MV Savina Caylyn (Oil Tanker)	22 (oil)	Released	2011-02-08	unknown
	Italy	MV Savina Caylyn (Oil Tanker)	22 (oil)	Released	2011-12-21	not known
Savina Caylyn was captured in the Arabian Sea off the coast of Yemen and released in December 2011 after a ransom was paid.
	Greece	MV Irene SL (oil tanker)	25 (oil)	Released	2011-02-09	unknown
	Greece	MV Irene SL (oil tanker)	25 (oil)	Released	2011-04-08	13.5 Million $
Irene SL was captured in the Arabian Sea off the coast of Oman.
	Malta	MV Sinin (Bulk Carrier)	23 (n/a)	Released	2011-02-12	unknown
	Malta	MV Sinin (Bulk Carrier)	23 (n/a)	Released	2011-08-14	not known
Sinin was captured in the Arabian Sea off the coast of Oman.
	United States	S/V Quest (Private yacht)	4 (n/a)	All crewmembers killed, vessel boarded by U.S. forces, pirates killed/detained	2011-02-18	unknown
	United States	S/V Quest (Private yacht)	4 (n/a)	All crewmembers killed, vessel boarded by U.S. forces, pirates killed/detained	2011-02-22	no
The private yacht Quest was captured in the Indian Ocean en route from India to Oman. After hearing gunfire early on the morning of 22 February, U.S. forces boarded the vessel and discovered that the crew of four had been killed. Pirates engaged the U.S. forces; two pirates were killed and 13 were detained; the bodies of two additional pirates were found.
	Denmark	S/V ING (Private yacht)	2 (+ 5 passengers: 2 adults, 3 children) (n/a)	released	2011-02-24	unknown
	Denmark	S/V ING (Private yacht)	2 (+ 5 passengers: 2 adults, 3 children) (n/a)	released		not known
A Danish yacht with four adults and three children aged 12 to 16 on board was captured on 24 February. They were released after six months in captivity.

== March ==
Image	Flag (owner)	Name (class)	Crew (cargo)	Status	Date of attack	Coordinates
Image	Flag (owner)	Name (class)	Crew (cargo)	Status	Date of release	Ransom demanded
	Bahamas (Japan)	MV Guanabara (Oil tanker)	24 (oil)	Secured	2011-03-04	unknown
	Bahamas (Japan)	MV Guanabara (Oil tanker)	24 (oil)	Secured	2011-03-05	n/a
Guanabara was captured in the Indian Ocean 328 nautical miles (607 km; 377 mi) southeast of Oman. The ship was boarded by a team from the USS Bulkeley who detained four pirates. The pirates were tried in Japan.
	India	INS Kalpeni, INS Khukri (P49) (Car Nicobar class fast attack craft, Khukri class corvette)	(n/a)	Attack failed; 13 crewmembers of FV Vega 5 rescued	2011-03-12	unknown
	India	INS Kalpeni, INS Khukri (P49) (Car Nicobar class fast attack craft, Khukri class corvette)	(n/a)	Attack failed; 13 crewmembers of FV Vega 5 rescued	n/a	n/a
While intercepting the captured Spanish-owned vessel, FV Vega 5, two Indian Navy corvettes, INS Kalpeni and INS Khukri were attacked by two pirate skiffs with firearms. During the exchange of fire, crewmembers went overboard while their vessel was being used as an attack base. They found 61 pirates on the captured vessel. Only 13 crewmembers from the FV Vega 5 were rescued.
	Indonesia	MV Sinar Kudus (Cargo ship)	20 (ferronickel)	Released by Indonesian Navy and Indonesian Special force (Secured)	2011-03-16	unknown
	Indonesia	MV Sinar Kudus (Cargo ship)	20 (ferronickel)	Released by Indonesian Navy and Indonesian Special force (Secured)	2011-05-01	US$9 million
The MV Sinar Kudus vessel, now released after being held at Eil Beach, Somalia, was carrying 8,300 tons of ferronickel from Aneka Tambang company worth about US$225 million at the current price. The Somali pirates on 9 April 2011 demanded a new US$9 million ransom, substantially higher than the previous demand of US$3.5 million, because they had been ignored. Both parties agreed on a US$4.5 million ransom after the ship had been held for 46 days. The Indonesian government had sent three ships, one aircraft and one helicopter with 800 soldiers deployed including 300 special forces. Although the government chose not to take a military option as it would have put the safety of the hostages in danger, 4 pirates were killed when the last batch of pirates were leaving the ship.

== April ==
Image	Flag (owner)	Name (class)	Crew (cargo)	Status	Date of attack	Coordinates
Image	Flag (owner)	Name (class)	Crew (cargo)	Status	Date of release	Ransom demanded
	Liberia (United Arab Emirates)	MV Arrilah-I (bulk carrier)	24 (Including 3 Safety Advisors) (Aluminium)	Repelled	2011-04-01	unknown
	Liberia (United Arab Emirates)	MV Arrilah-I (bulk carrier)	24 (Including 3 Safety Advisors) (Aluminium)	Repelled	2011-04-02	n/a
On the morning of 1 April 2011 a mother ship attempted to intercept the bulk carrier Arrilah-I in the Arabian Sea around 400nm west of Mumbai, India. There was a thick fog and the mother ship was only visible on radar. When the mother ship broke through the fog and sighted the Arrilah-I, they launched two attack skiffs. The pirates overcame two levels of defences and boarded. A 30-hour struggle for control followed. The pirates used AK-47s, RPG-7s, threw hand grenades into the citadel, and used explosives to break in and set the ship on fire to drive the crew out. Warships from the U.S. 5th fleet responded to the call for help and sent two fighter jets to scare the pirates, but it had little effect. Later the first day a helicopter came to help the crew to navigate towards the UAE. The first warship arrived on the scene the next day and assembled a boarding party who captured 10 pirates. By sunset on the second day the crew were freed. A task force of 30 UAE special forces soldiers sailed with the ship to her owners in Abu Dhabi where the pirates were disembarked and jailed. Reportedly the mother ship was identified as Jelbut 28. Lukas Rautenbach was the Unarmed Security Team Leader.
	Italy	MV Rosalia D'Amato (bulk carrier)	21 (6 Italians, 15 Filipinos) (soya beans)	Released	2011-04-21	unknown
	Italy	MV Rosalia D'Amato (bulk carrier)	21 (6 Italians, 15 Filipinos) (soya beans)	Released	2011-11-25	n/a
In the early morning of 21 April 2011, the 74,500-ton MV Rosalia D' Amato was captured 350NM southeast of Salalah, Oman while on its way from Paranagua, Brazil to Bandar Imam Khomeini, Iran. On 25 November 2011, all crew members were released and are reportedly safe and in healthy condition.
	Singapore	MT Gemini (Oil tanker)	25 (4 Korean, 13 Indonesians, 3 Myanmar, 5 Chinese) (crude palm oil)	Captured	2011-04-30	unknown
	Singapore	MT Gemini (Oil tanker)	25 (4 Korean, 13 Indonesians, 3 Myanmar, 5 Chinese) (crude palm oil)	Captured	2011-12-03	$10 million
The 20,989 tonne, Singapore flagged and owned vessel was on its way to Mombasa (Kenya) from Kuala Tanjung (Malaysia) when it was attacked and hijacked. On 2 December 2011, the pirates released 21 crewmembers (along with the ship), while keeping 4 Korean crewmembers captive until the South Korean government pays them a ransom of US$4 million. The 21 crewmembers and vessel were released after a ransom of US$6 million was paid.

== May ==
Image	Flag (owner)	Name (class)	Crew (cargo)	Status	Date of attack	Coordinates
Image	Flag (owner)	Name (class)	Crew (cargo)	Status	Date of release	Ransom demanded
	Panama (China)	MV Full City (Bulk carrier)	unknown (unknown)	Secured	2011-05-05	unknown
	Panama (China)	MV Full City (Bulk carrier)	unknown (unknown)	Secured	2011-05-05	n/a
The United Kingdom Maritime Trade Organization received a distress call from Full City and passed the information to U.S. Fifth Fleet. An Indian Navy Tu-142 maritime patrol aircraft located the Full City, and while the Turkish frigate Giresun boarded the bulk carrier, the U.S. guided-missile cruiser Bunker Hill intercepted a dhow believed to be the 'mothership' for the pirate attack. Bunker Hill's VBSS boarding party seized weapons and other equipment commonly used in piracy, and the boarding party also sank a small skiff being towed by the dhow. Giresun's boarding party found the Full City's crew safe and in control of their ship.
	Denmark	HDMS Esbern Snare (L17) (Absalon class flexible support ship)	16 (unknown)	4 pirates killed, 24 pirates arrested (including 10 wounded) and 16 hostages rescued	2011-05-12	unknown
	Denmark	HDMS Esbern Snare (L17) (Absalon class flexible support ship)	16 (unknown)	4 pirates killed, 24 pirates arrested (including 10 wounded) and 16 hostages rescued	2011-05-12	n/a
During a patrol along the Somali coast on the morning of Thursday 12 May, the Esbern Snare was approached by a pirate mother ship. When the Esbern Snare tried to stop the boat using loudspeaker, it opened fire which was immediately returned. Shortly after the exchange of fire, several weapons were thrown overboard and there were signs of surrender. 4 pirates were killed and buried while 10 others were wounded. None of the 16 hostages and no crew members of the Esbern Snare were wounded. The 24 pirates aboard the warship are awaiting trial and the navy has taken control of the mother ship.

== August ==
Image	Flag (owner)	Name (class)	Crew (cargo)	Status	Date of attack	Coordinates
Image	Flag (owner)	Name (class)	Crew (cargo)	Status	Date of release	Ransom demanded
	Marshall Islands (India)	MT Fairchem Bogey (Oil Tanker)	21 Indian (Oil)	Released	2011-08-20	unknown
	Marshall Islands (India)	MT Fairchem Bogey (Oil Tanker)	21 Indian (Oil)	Released	2011-01-12	$8 Million
Fairchem Bogey was in anchorage at the port limit of 5 nautical miles from Salalah, Oman, waiting for berthing instructions when hijacked in the early morning hours of 20 August 2011. This was the first time that a ship was hijacked within the port limits and taken away while the port authorities could do nothing but watch.
	Saudi Arabia	MT Al Balad (Oil Tanker)	(Oil)	Capture failed	2011-08-21	unknown
Al Balad evaded capture attempt 85 nautical miles southwest of Salalah, Oman on 21 August 2011.
	Liberia (Greece)	MSC Namibia II (Container ship)	()	Capture failed	2011-08-23	unknown
Namibia II evaded capture attempt 100 nautical miles south of Mukalla, Oman on 23 August 2011.

== September ==
Image	Flag (owner)	Name (class)	Crew (cargo)	Status	Date of attack	Coordinates
Image	Flag (owner)	Name (class)	Crew (cargo)	Status	Date of release	Ransom demanded
	France	S/V Tribal Cat (Private yacht)	2 sailors (none)	1 fatality, 1 sailor rescued, 7 pirates arrested	2011-09-10	unknown
	France	S/V Tribal Cat (Private yacht)	2 sailors (none)	1 fatality, 1 sailor rescued, 7 pirates arrested		n/a
Responding to a Mayday call, the German frigate Bayern found the catamaran without crew on 10 September. The Spanish ship Galicia later stopped and sank a skiff that was holding one of the sailors; the other one had been killed. Seven alleged pirates were arrested.

== November ==
Image	Flag (owner)	Name (class)	Crew (cargo)	Status	Date of attack	Coordinates
Image	Flag (owner)	Name (class)	Crew (cargo)	Status	Date of release	Ransom demanded
	Taiwan	MV Chin Yi Wen (Fishing vessel)	28 sailors ()	Ship recovered by crew: 3 sailors injured, pirates thrown overboard	about 2011-11-02	unknown
	Taiwan	MV Chin Yi Wen (Fishing vessel)	28 sailors ()	Ship recovered by crew: 3 sailors injured, pirates thrown overboard		n/a
The vessel was captured by pirates off the east coast of Africa. The crew, which included several Vietnamese war veterans, was kept hostage but fought back, throwing the pirates into the ocean and recovering the vessel.
