= Chris Deering =

American businessman and marketer

- Born: Christopher Deering; January 15, 1945 (age 81); Boston, Massachusetts, U.S.
- Education: Harvard University (MBA); Boston College (BS)
- Occupations: Chairman of trc family entertainment ltd. chairman of tangentix ltd.
- Years active: 1970–present
- Awards: BAFTA Interactive Industry Award (2003)

Christopher Deering (born January 15, 1945) is an American businessman and marketer best known for his role as president of Sony Computer Entertainment Europe. He is credited as one of the main marketers of the successful PlayStation and PlayStation 2 video game consoles. The PS1 was the first video game console to ship a 100 million units and the PS2 remains the most sold console of all time selling around 160 million units. In 2003 Deering received the BAFTA Interactive Industry Award for his lifetime contributions to the game industry.

== Early life and education ==
Deering was raised in Boston, Massachusetts, his mother was an Italian-American and his father a German who emigrated to the United States when he was 18. He claims to have had a strict upbringing with his mother reportedly washing his mouth with soap when he misbehaved and his father not netting Chris an allowance, encouraging him to work for himself. While growing up in Boston, his family was poor and unable to afford a TV or car for their first 14 years. His father worked in the Catering business for several years and started managing the Dining halls at Harvard University. Despite Deering's difficult childhood, he has credited his upbringing to his motivation and success in the gaming industry.

Deering attended the Boston Latin School, the oldest continuously running free school in the USA. His parents had pressured him to achieve high marks from grades 1–6 so that he could meet the standards to get into Boston Latin school, which he attended from grades 6 to 12. Within his school, he was a part of the "Math X" section of 32 students; 13 of these students were admitted to Harvard and 4 to MIT. Deering later went on to major in computer science at Boston College where he graduated magna cum laude. Immediately after his graduation he enrolled at Harvard Business School where he studied Marketing and obtained a master of business administration.

== Career ==
Deering started his career as product manager at the Gillette razor brand in the 70's. He went on to work at McKinsey & Co in New York in marketing studies before returning to Gillette as head of worldwide shaving and then head of European marketing across all categories including toiletries and writing instruments.

Deering's first involvement in the video game industry was his job as Vice President of international marketing for Atari, Inc. In this time he also served as VP international for Spinnaker Software, a Boston-based educational video game start up.

Following his involvement at Atari, he became head of international marketing at Columbia Pictures until the company was purchased by Sony in 1989. This later lead to his career as International Chief operating officer at Sony Pictures Home Entertainment from 1990 to 1995. He went on to take two other positions at Sony serving as president of Sony Computer Entertainment Europe from 1995 to 2005 and of Sony Electronics Europe from 2003 to 2005.

After his career at Sony, he became a chairman, Board Director and director of in game advertising at Codemasters Ltd., the world's leading independent video game developer. He also worked as Director of Wayfinder Systems and PlaySpan. Since 2010, Deering has worked as a board member at Geomerics Ltd, European Games Group, Jetix Europe, TRC Family Entertainment Ltd and the Chairman of Tangentix Ltd.
