= KAMD =

KAMD may refer to:

- Korean Air and Missile Defense, multilayered air defense system being developed by South Korea
- KAMD-FM, radio station licensed to Camden, Arkansas
