= Lamd =

LAMD or lamd may refer to:

- Low Altitude Missile Defense, part of Korean Air and Missile Defense
- L-arginine maleate dihydrate, an organic nonlinear optical material

== See also ==
- Lamedh, the twelfth letter in many Semitic languages
