= Spare Change =

Spare Change may refer to:

- Spare Change News, a street newspaper founded in 1992 and published in Cambridge, Massachusetts
- Spare Change (novel), a 2007 crime novel by Robert B. Parker
- Spare Change Payments, an online payments company
- Spare Change (video game), a 1983 video game for various home computer models.
- "Spare Chaynge", song by Jefferson Airplane
