= M-SAM =

South Korean medium range surface-to-air missile

Medium-range Surface-to-Air Missile 중거리 지대공 미사일
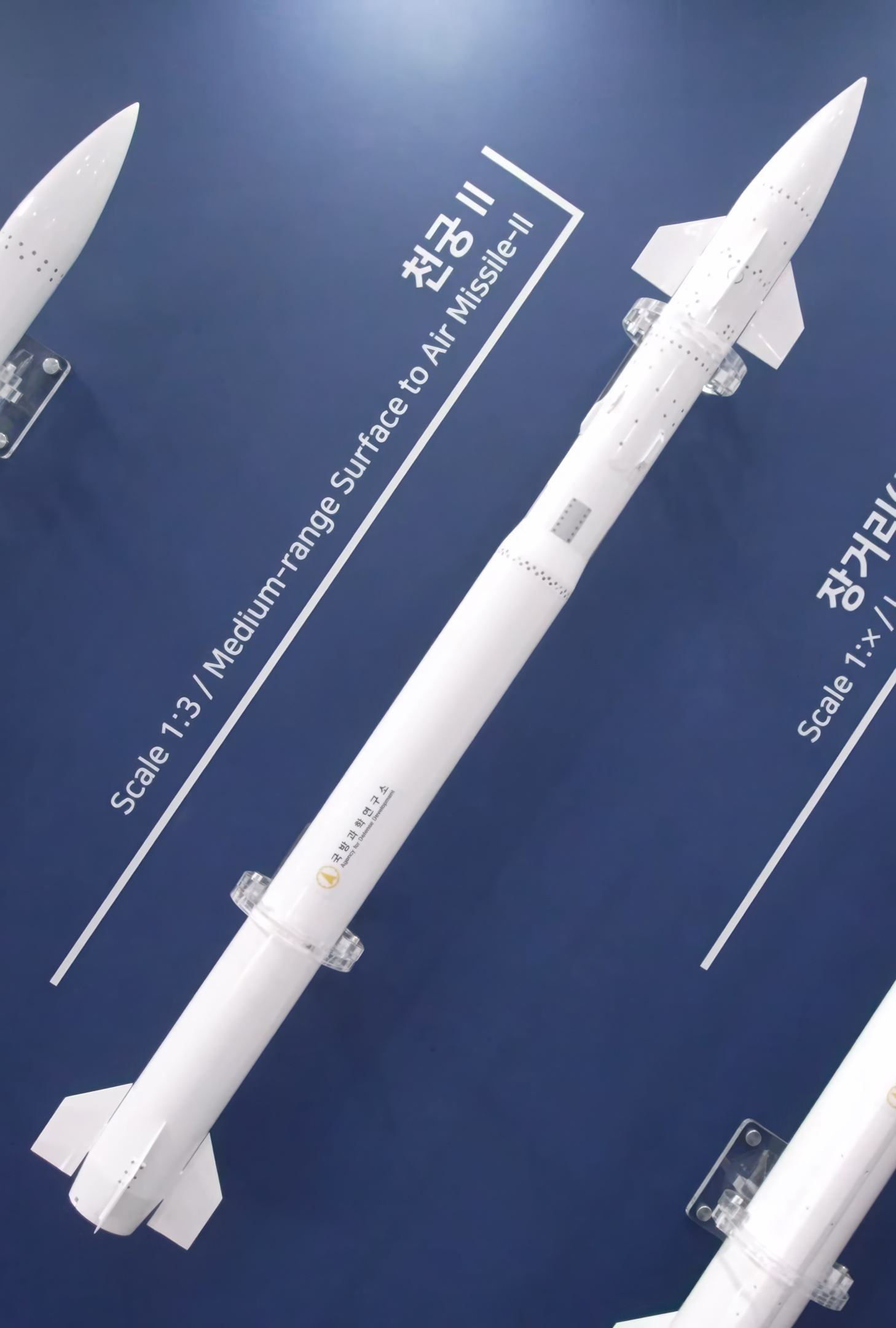
- M-SAM Block-II missile scale model
- Type: Medium-range, mobile surface-to-air missile/anti-ballistic missile system
- Place of origin: South Korea

Service history
- In service: 2015–present
- Used by: See Operators
- Wars: 2026 Iran war

Production history
- Designer: Agency for Defense Development; Almaz-Antey (Block 1)
- Designed: Block 1: 2001–2011; Block 2: 2012–2017; Block 3: 2024–In development
- Manufacturer: Hanwha Aerospace (launcher, radar); LIG Defense & Aerospace (missile, system)
- Produced: Block 1: 2015–2020; Block 2: 2018–present

Specifications
- Mass: Missile: 400 kilograms (880 lb)
- Length: 4.61 meters (15 ft 1 in)
- Diameter: 275 millimeters (10.8 in)
- Engine: Solid-fuel rocket motor
- Operational range: Block 1: 40 km (25 mi); Block 2: 50 km (31 mi)
- Flight ceiling: Block 1: 15 km (49,000 ft); Block 2: 20 km (66,000 ft)
- Maximum speed: Block 1: Mach 4.5 (1,530 m/s; 5,510 km/h); Block 2: Mach 5 (1,700 m/s; 6,100 km/h)
- Guidance system: Inertial guidance with midcourse updates through datalink, terminal active radar homing

The M-SAM (Medium-range Surface-to-Air Missile; Skybolt; Korean: 천궁; Hanja: 天弓; RR: Cheongung), or KM-SAM, is a South Korean medium range surface-to-air missile (SAM) system that was developed by the Agency for Defense Development (ADD) with technical support from Almaz-Antey and Fakel, based on technology from the 9M96 missile used on S-350E and S-400 missile systems. Originally designated as Cheolmae-2 (Iron Hawk; Korean: 철매; Hanja: 鐵鷹; RR: Cheol-mae) during its development phase, the system was officially renamed Cheongung upon completion. M-SAM serves as a key system in South Korea's Korean Air and Missile Defense (KAMD).

== Design and development ==
A complete battery consists of four to six 8-cell transporter erector launchers (TELs), a passive electronically scanned array (PESA) multi-function 3D radar (based on the one from the Russian S-400), and a fire command vehicle. The radar operates in the X-band and rotates at a rate of 40 rpm, covering up to 80 degrees in elevation. It can detect targets within 100 km (62 mi) and track up to 40 simultaneously.

The KM-SAM is the middle-tier of South Korea's three-tier aerial and missile defense system. Though it was developed in Russia by the Almaz Design Bureau in association with Samsung Thales, LIG Nex1 (now LIG Defense & Aerospace), and Doosan DST, localization and industrialization were done in South Korea enough to consider it an indigenous system. South Korea has independent export rights under international intellectual property law and does not use Russian-made parts. Therefore, export is possible regardless of international sanctions against Russia. The KM-SAM can intercept targets up to an altitude of 15 km (49,000 ft) at a range of 40 km (25 mi). It is to replace upgraded MIM-23 Hawk batteries in South Korea and be made available for export. Almaz-Antey continued with the program after prototypes were transferred and have created a distinctly Russian version called the Vityaz missile system.

The Republic of Korea Air Force (ROKAF) revealed in mid-2015 that the KM-SAM would soon enter mass production and begin delivery to the Air Force that September, replacing the Hawk missile that had been in Korean service since 1964, which the United States military retired in 2002. The system can intercept up to six targets simultaneously, and the missiles have anti-electronic warfare capabilities to keep functioning despite jamming.

On 28 April 2020, the Defense Acquisition Program Administration (DAPA) announced that deliveries of the Cheongung KM-SAM Block 1 system to the ROKAF had been completed. In July 2021, South Korea retired its last MIM-23 Hawk system, phasing it out for the Cheongung Block 1.

=== Operational Concept ===
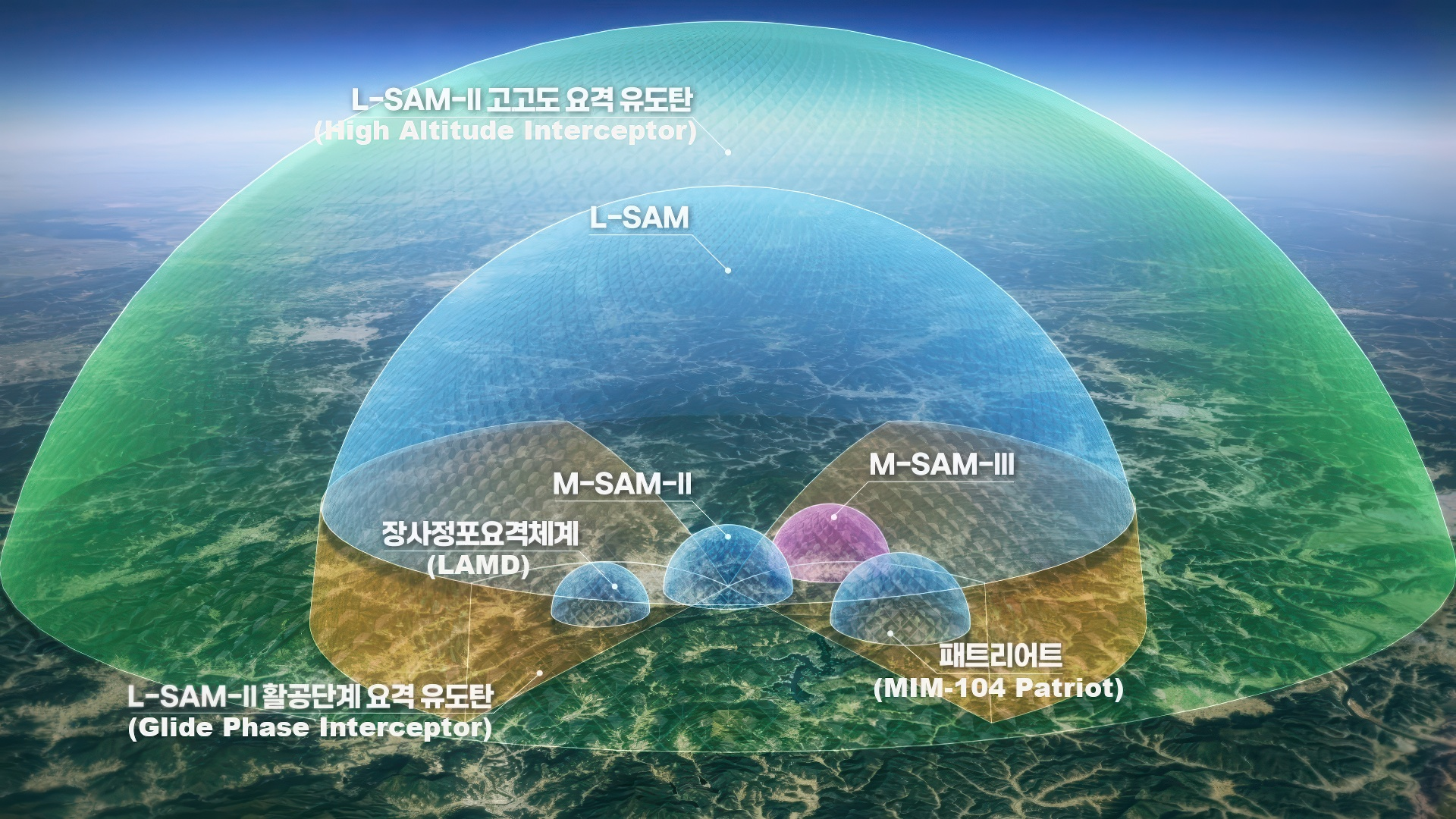

1	Low Altitude Missile Defense (LAMD) anti-artillery interceptor
2	M-SAM Block 2 medium-range lower tier air defense system
3	M-SAM Block 3 boost phase interceptor (BPI)
4	PAC-2 and PAC-3 complementary air defense system

5	L-SAM Block 2 glide phase interceptor (GPI)
6	L-SAM Block 1 long-range multi-layered air defense system
7	L-SAM Block 2 high altitude interceptor (HAI)

=== KM-SAM battery configuration ===
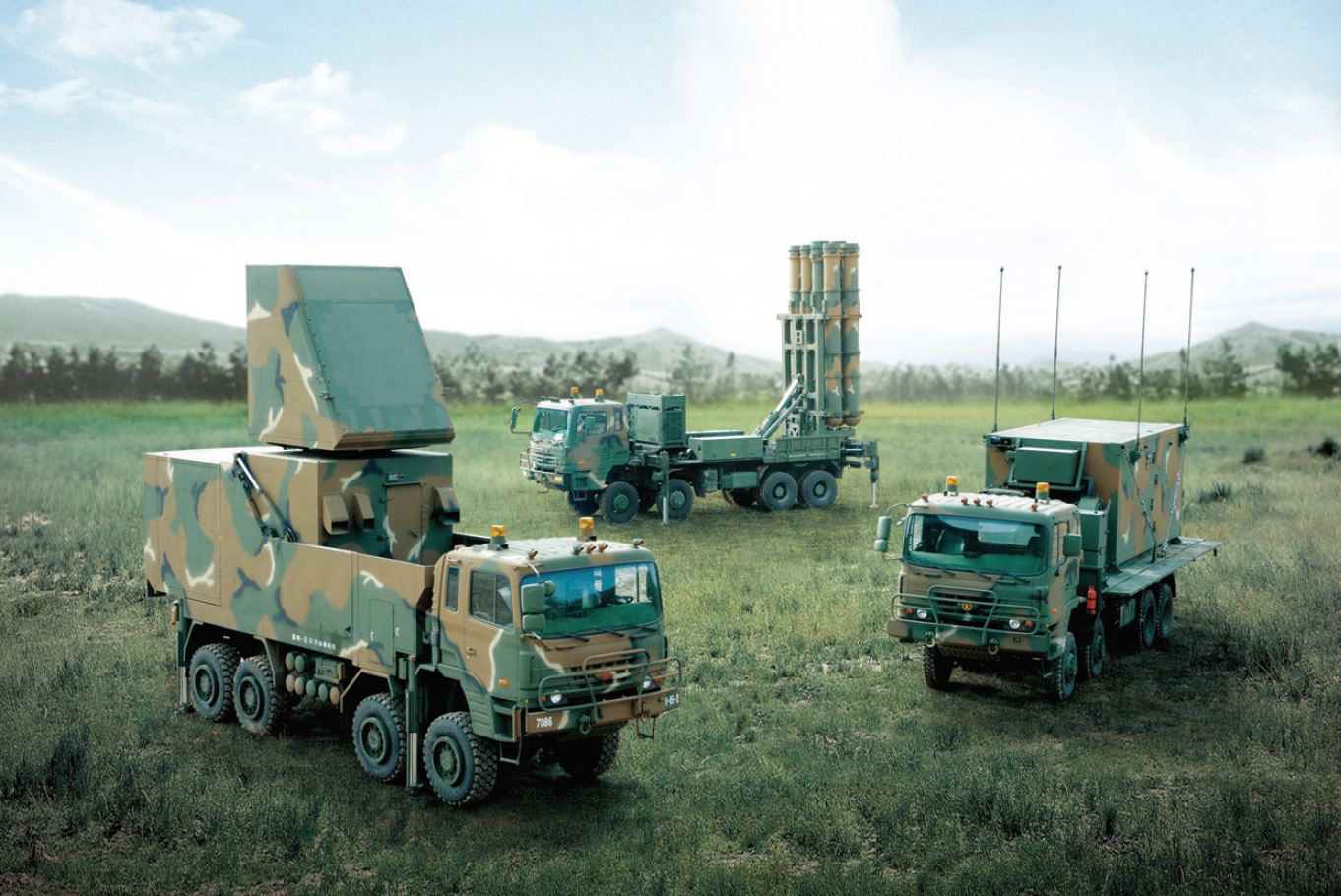
M-SAM's multifunction radar, vertical launcher, and control center vehicle mockup models

The configuration of KM-SAM batteries typically includes multifunction radar, vertical launchers, and control center vehicles.

- Engagement Control Center (ECS): 1
- Multifunction Radar (MFR): 1
- Launchers: 4–6
- Missiles per Launcher: 8
- Power Generator: 1

== Improvements ==
=== Block 2 ===
In April 2017, South Korean military officials revealed that a low-tier missile defense system based on the Cheongung was in the final phase of development. Modifying the standard SAM with hit-to-kill technology enables it to intercept incoming ballistic missiles at mid altitudes of around 20 km (66,000 ft). The Block 2 interceptor is effective against both aircraft and ballistic targets and has 30% improved low-altitude detection and tracking and 60% improved multiple target engagement capabilities.

The KM-SAM will be able to be launched from the Korean Vertical Launch System (K-VLS) aboard Daegu-class frigates in a naval role.

=== Block 3 ===
The DAPA decided to develop KM-SAM Block 3 by investing 2.8 trillion won from 2024 to 2034. According to Defense News, it will be equipped with an active electronically scanned array (AESA) radar.

=== Further development ===
The KM-SAM block 2 was to be an upper-tier interceptor designed to take down ballistic missiles, offering capabilities similar to that of the American Terminal High Altitude Area Defense missile with a range of 150 km (93 mi) and ceiling of 200,000 ft (61 km). Performance levels were to be twice as superior to the Patriot and Cheolmae II missiles, and was expected to be based on the Russian S-400 technology. This role was filled with the Long-range Surface-to-Air Missile (L-SAM), which was developed under the leadership of the Agency for Defense Development.

== Exports ==
LIG Nex1 participated in International Defence Exhibition held in the United Arab Emirates (UAE) in 2021 and showed off the Korean weapon system including KM-SAM and AT-1K Raybolt.

On 16 November 2021, the UAE's Ministry of Defense tweeted that it plans to acquire the M-SAM as a "qualitative addition" to its existing air defense capabilities and that the deal could reach US$3.5 billion. An official at South Korea's DAPA said that the announcement was "positive" but "we still need to see how negotiations on the details will proceed." On 16 January 2022, the DAPA of the South Korean Government announced that the UAE would purchase the system in a deal worth $3.5 billion. At the time, it was the largest arms export deal ever made by South Korea.

In 2022, the US requested South Korea to send this missile system to Ukraine during the Russian invasion. However South Korea declined on the basis of its security situation.

In February 2024, the South Korean Ministry of National Defense announced that Saudi Arabia would purchase 10 KM-SAM Block 2 batteries, in a deal worth $3.2 billion.

In September 2024, the Iraqi Ministry of Defense signed a deal with LIG Nex1 worth $2.8 billion, in order to acquire an unspecified number of KM-SAM Block 2 batteries.

The Ministry of Defense of Indonesia has issued a Letter of Intent (LoI) to LIG Nex1 on 18 May 2026 for the procurement of two batteries of KM-SAM Block 2.

== Operational history ==
On 3 March 2026, 60 surface-to-air missiles launched from two M-SAM batteries deployed in the United Arab Emirates during the war in Iran were reported to have successfully intercepted Iranian missiles with a 96% interception rate.

== Operators ==
Current operators: South Korea, UAE Future Users: Saudi Arabia, Iraq

=== Current operators ===
(South Korea) Republic of Korea Air Force (19 batteries + 6 on order)
- Block 1, 18 batteries in service, 4 launchers of 8 missiles per battery.
- Block 2, 1 battery in service + 6 on order (total planned 7), 4 launchers of 8 missiles per battery.

United Arab Emirates Army (12 batteries)
- Block 2, 12 batteries ordered in January 2023, to be produced partially in the UAE, worth USD $3.5 billion. 2 batteries in service.

=== Future operators ===
(Iraq) Iraqi Air Defence Command (8 batteries)
- Block 2, 8 batteries ordered in September 2024 for USD $2.8 billion.

(Saudi Arabia) Royal Saudi Air Defense Forces (10 batteries)
- Block 2, 10 batteries ordered in February 2024 for USD $3.2 billion.

=== Potential operators ===
(Indonesia) Indonesian National Armed Forces
Indonesia has issued Letter of Intent for two batteries of KM-SAM Block 2.
(Morocco) Royal Moroccan Army
Under consideration along with up to 400 K2 Black Panther tanks.

== See also ==
- Korean Air and Missile Defense

Comparable systems

- MIM-104 Patriot
- David's Sling
- S-300
- S-400

South Korean Surface-to-Air systems

- KP-SAM
- K-SAM (Pegasus, based on Crotale)
- K-SAAM
- L-SAM
