= PlaySpan =

- Type: Private
- Industry: Payments
- Founded: 2006
- Fate: Acquired by Visa Inc.
- Headquarters: Foster City, California, USA
- Area served: Worldwide
- Products: UltimatePay
- Parent: Visa, Inc.

PlaySpan is a payments company whose payments platform handles transactions for digital goods in online games, digital media, and social networks.

== Company history ==
PlaySpan was founded in 2006 by Karl Mehta. In July 2008, PlaySpan acquired Internet Payment Solutions, an alternative payments company, and in April 2009, PlaySpan acquired Spare Change Payments, a social media payments company.

The company received a total of $46 million in funding from investors Easton Capital, Menlo Ventures, Novel TMT Ventures, Silicon Valley Bank Capital, STIC Investments, Softbank, Vodafone, and GE Asset Management.

In March 2011, Visa Inc. acquired PlaySpan for $190 million in cash + earn-outs over 2 years, amounting to approximately $240 million in total purchase consideration.
