= Korean Air and Missile Defense =

South Korean air defense system

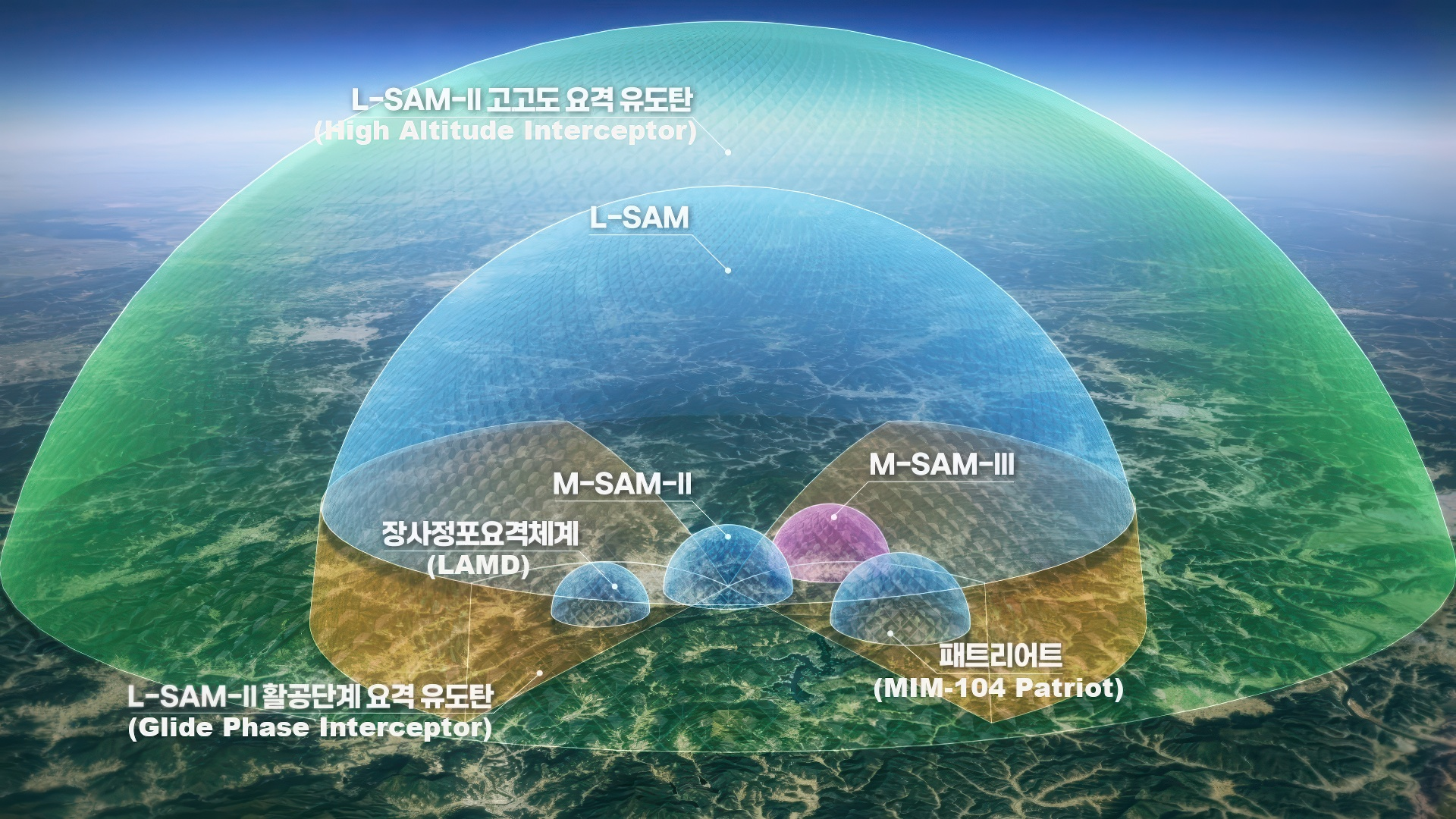
- Configuration of Korean Air and Missile Defense
- Type: Counter rocket and artillery and multi-layered air defense system
- Place of origin: South Korea

Service history
- In service: 2016–present
- Used by: Republic of Korea Armed Forces
- Wars: 2026 Iran war

Production history
- Designer: Agency for Defense Development; Hanwha Aerospace; LIG Defense & Aerospace
- Designed: 2015
- Manufacturer: Hanwha Aerospace; LIG Defense & Aerospace
- Produced: 2015–present

- Korean Air and Missile Defense
- Hangul: 한국형 미사일 방어 체계
- Hanja: 韓國型미사일防禦體系
- RR: Hangukhyeong misail bangeo chegye
- MR: Han'gukhyŏng misail pangŏ ch'egye

The Korean Air and Missile Defense (KAMD; Korean: 한국형 미사일 방어 체계) is a multilayered air defense system being developed by South Korea. It integrates command, detection, and interception systems to provide comprehensive protection. It consists of LAMD, M-SAM, L-SAM, etc. KAMD is a key component of South Korea's three-axis defense strategy, designed to counter North Korea's nuclear threats. With the integration of such systems, South Korea becomes the third nation - following the U.S. and Israel - aiming to field an indigenous, multi-layered air defense network capable of intercepting ballistic threats across low, medium, and high altitudes using hit-to-kill technology.

== History ==
North Korea has been enhancing its missile technology since the mid-1970s by improving Soviet-era Scud missiles. By the 1980s, North Korea had established a mass production system for Scud missiles and entered into military agreements with Middle Eastern countries, exporting hundreds of missiles to the region. After successfully testing the Scud-B missile in 1984 with an estimated maximum range of 320 km, North Korea followed with a successful test of the Scud-C missile in 1989, extending its range to 500 km, putting the entire Korean Peninsula within its reach. By the early to mid-1990s, domestic authorities judged that North Korea had reached the level of a global missile technology powerhouse. In 1993, North Korea launched the longer-range Rodong missile, and in 1998, they tested the Taepodong missile, which doubled the range of previous systems.

North Korea's artillery and missile threats against South Korea were also expressed during the 1994 inter-Korean peace talks under the Kim Young-sam government, particularly through a statement made by Park Young-su, North Korea's Vice Chairman of the Committee for the Peaceful Reunification of Korea, who mentioned "Seoul will be turned into a sea of fire." Following the remark, the inter-Korean talks broke down without an agreement. Subsequently, North Korea continued to issue threats of turning Seoul into a sea of fire through numerous official statements.

In 1999, the Bill Clinton administration proposed that South Korea join the Theater Missile Defense (TMD) system, which the U.S. was developing with Japan. However, the Kim Dae-jung government judged that TMD would not be an effective countermeasure against North Korean missiles and that South Korea lacked the economic power and technology to participate at the time. Additionally, considering the diplomatic backlash from surrounding powers like Russia and China, South Korea decided to abstain from the TMD system. Instead, South Korea began conceptualizing a missile defense system more suited to its needs.

Initially, the threat was solely focused on North Korea's short-range ballistic missiles, such as the Scud missiles, which posed the biggest threat at the time. In response, the Kim Dae-jung administration began developing a domestic medium-range surface-to-air missile system and started the development of M-SAM, Cheongung. Later, during the Roh Moo-hyun administration, as discussions about the transfer of wartime operational control from the U.S. to South Korea began, the need for South Korea to independently possess command, detection, and strike capabilities, which had been provided by the U.S., became evident. This led to the start of long-term technological development for these capabilities. Under the Lee Myung-bak administration, the Ministry of National Defense's long-term requirements for Kill Chain and KAMD technologies became more concrete, and the related development projects were actively evaluated and pursued.

The KAMD began as an independent, multilayered air defense system focused on intercepting missiles in the terminal phase and at medium altitudes (M-SAM). In line with South Korea's security needs, the scope and capabilities of the system are now being expanded to intercept threats at low altitudes (LAMD), as well as those in the midcourse phases and high-altitude (L-SAM).

== Configuration ==
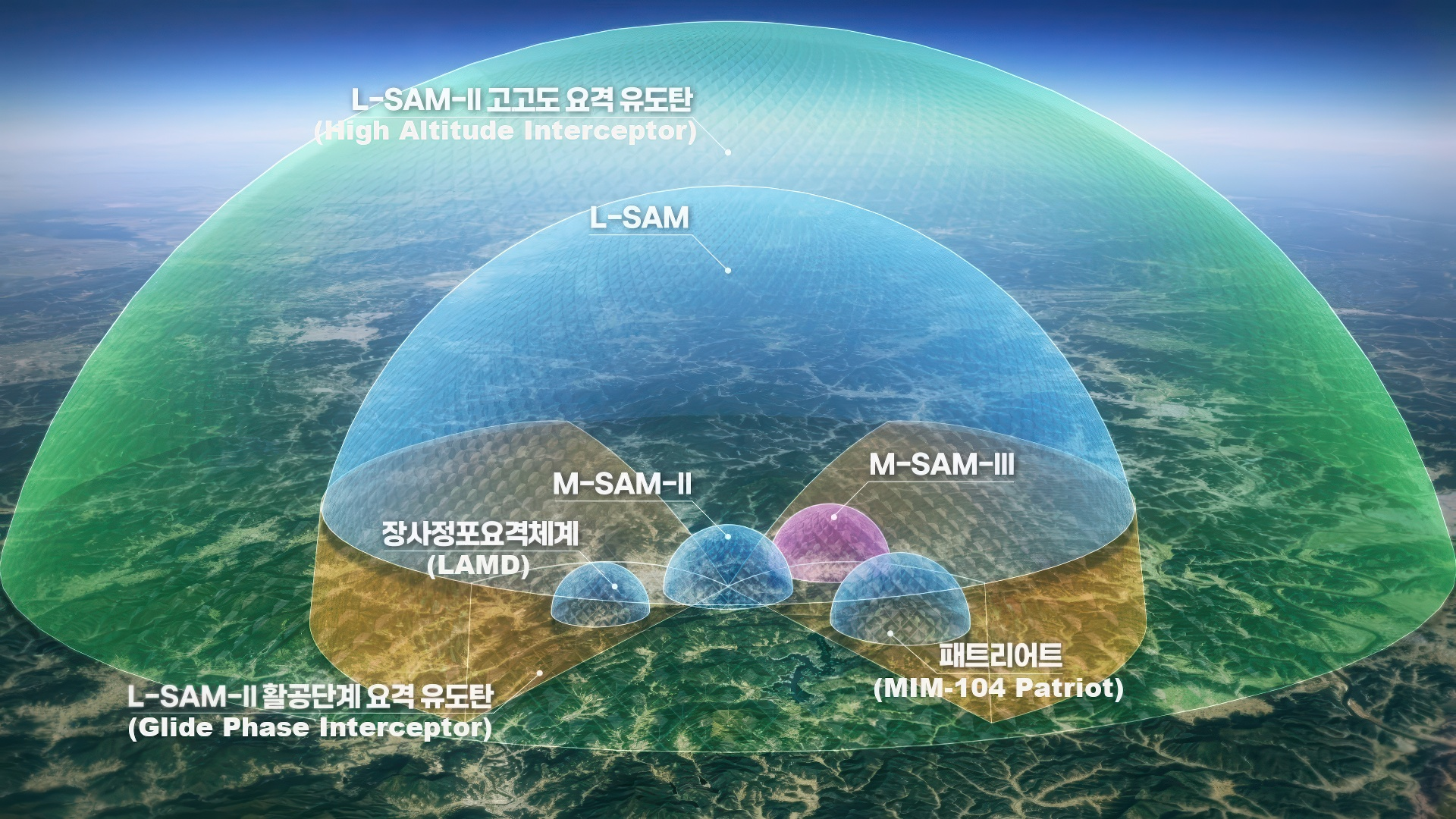

1	Low Altitude Missile Defense (LAMD) anti-artillery interceptor
2	M-SAM Block 2 medium-range lower tier air defense system
3	M-SAM Block 3 boost phase interceptor (BPI)
4	PAC-2 and PAC-3 complementary air defense system

5	L-SAM Block 2 glide phase interceptor (GPI)
6	L-SAM Block 1 long-range multi-layered air defense system
7	L-SAM Block 2 high altitude interceptor (HAI)

=== Command System ===
The command system includes KAMD (Korea Air and Missile Defense), operated by the Republic of Korea Air Force, and LAMD (Low Altitude Missile Defense), operated by the Republic of Korea Army.

=== Detection System ===
- Ground-based Systems
  - Interception System Radar
    - LAMD: LAMD MFR.
    - Patriot: The AN/MPQ-65 radar.
    - M-SAM: Phased Array Tracking Radar to Intercept On Target.
    - L-SAM: Long-Range MFR.
  - Early Warning Radar
    - Super Green Pine Radar: 4 units.
    - K-BAT-II (Cheongyeong)
- Sea-based Systems
  - Aegis Radar
    - Sejong the Great-class destroyer: The AN/SPY-1 Aegis radar.
    - Jeongjo the Great-class destroyer: The AN/SPY-1 Aegis radar .
    - Chungnam-class frigate: This ship, often referred to as a "mini Aegis ship," is expected to be equipped with a Korean-made phased array radar.
    - KDDX-class destroyer
- Air-based Systems
  - Reconnaissance Aircraft
    - E-737 Peace Eye: 8 units.
    - RQ-4 Global Hawk: 4 units.
    - Next-generation Ground Early Warning Aircraft
    - Korean Medium-to-High Altitude Unmanned Reconnaissance Aircraft: Similar level to RQ-4 Global Hawk.
    - Next-generation Corps-level Unmanned Reconnaissance Aircraft: Similar level to MQ-1 Predator.
    - RQ-102: Division-level unmanned reconnaissance aircraft developed by Korean Air.
    - Dassault Falcon 2000: 6 units.
- Space-based Systems
  - Satellites
    - ANASIS-II: The military-exclusive communication satellite.
    - 425 satellites: Military reconnaissance satellites. 5 units.
    - Micro-Satellite Constellation for Reconnaissance: More than 20 micro-satellites which will be scattered into low orbit using a solid-fuel launch vehicle to establish a real-time surveillance system in a short period.
    - Micro-Satellite Constellation for Practical Use: A total of 11 micro-satellites developed by KAIST (Korea Advanced Institute of Science and Technology).

=== Intercept Systems ===
- Low Altitude (0–12 km, Troposphere)
  - Land-based CIWS-II: 30mm Forward Dispersal Rounds (AHEAD, Advanced Hit Efficiency And Destruction).
  - Cheonkwang: High-power Laser Intercept System.
  - KP-SAM Chiron (Shingung): Portable anti-aircraft missile, cruise missile defense system.
  - LAMD: Low Altitude Missile Defense. Versions 1 and 2 are under development.
- Medium Altitude (12–40 km, Stratosphere)
  - Ground
    - M-SAM I: Medium-range aircraft/missile intercept system developed by Agency for Defence Development. 18 batteries manufactured and deployed by Hanwha Aerospace.
    - Patriot (PAC-2 GEM+/GEM-T): Surface-to-air missile developed by Raytheon.
    - M-SAM II: Enhanced version of the M-SAM I with improved intercept and engagement capabilities developed by Agency for Defence Development. 20 batteries manufactured and deployed by Hanwha Aerospace.
    - Patriot (PAC-3 CRI/MSE): Existing PAC-2 batteries were upgraded to PAC-3 missiles.
    - M-SAM III: An upgraded version of the M-SAM II with improved intercept and engagement capabilities developed by Agency for Defence Development.
  - Sea
    - Surface-to-Air Missile-II: A new medium-range surface-to-air missile being developed comparable to SM-2 missile.
    - SM-2: Medium-range surface-to-air missile developed by Raytheon. SM-2MR Block IIIA/B.
    - SM-6: Long-range surface-to-air missile developed by Raytheon. RIM-174 Standard ERAM.
  - Air
    - AIM-9 Sidewinder (M/L/X): short-range air-to-air missile developed by Raytheon, Ford Aerospace, and Loral Corp.
- High Altitude (40–80 km, Mesosphere)
  - L-SAM I: Korean high-altitude surface-to-air missile developed by Agency for Defence Development, Hanwha Aerospace, LIG Nex1. Also known as "Korean THAAD." ABM (Anti-Ballistic Missile) and AAM (Anti-Air Missile) types.
- Exoatmospheric (Above 80 km, Thermosphere/Exosphere)
  - L-SAM II: An upgraded version of the L-SAM I developed by Agency for Defence Development, Hanwha Aerospace, LIG Nex1. High-Altitude Interceptor (HAI), Glide Phase Interceptor (GPI) types.
  - THAAD (Terminal High Altitude Area Defense): High-altitude surface-to-air missile developed by Lockheed Martin. Operated by the United States Forces Korea.
  - SM-3: Exoatmospheric intercept missile developed by Raytheon for intercepting missiles in the outer atmosphere.

== Operators ==
=== Current operator ===
(South Korea) Republic of Korea Air Force
- LAMD: Development in progress.
- M-SAM I: 18 batteries in service.
- M-SAM II: 20 batteries in service.
- M-SAM III: Development in progress.
- L-SAM I: Serial production started. Deployment starts in 2027.
- L-SAM II: Development in progress.

United Arab Emirates Army
- M-SAM II: 12 batteries ordered in January 2022 under a $3.5 billion agreement, including local co-production arrangements; deliveries began in 2024, with at least three batteries delivered as of 2026.

=== Future operators ===
(Iraq) Iraqi Armed Forces
- M-SAM II: 8 batteries ordered in September 2024.

(Saudi Arabia) Royal Saudi Air Defense Forces
- M-SAM II: 10 batteries ordered in February 2024.

=== Potential operators ===
- In September 2026, South Korean defense contractor Hanwha and the Emirati state-owned conglomerate EDGE Group signed a preliminary term sheet in Abu Dhabi to cooperate on integrated air defense, covering potential procurement and local co-production of the L-SAM system as well as additional M-SAM II batteries. Earlier requests for information (RFI) and purchase inquiries regarding the L-SAM system have also been submitted in the Middle East with Saudi Arabia and Iraq identified alongside the UAE as prospective buyers.

== See also ==
- M-SAM
- L-SAM
