= TRC Family Entertainment =

Studio and Video Game Developer based in Malta

TRC Family Entertainment Limited
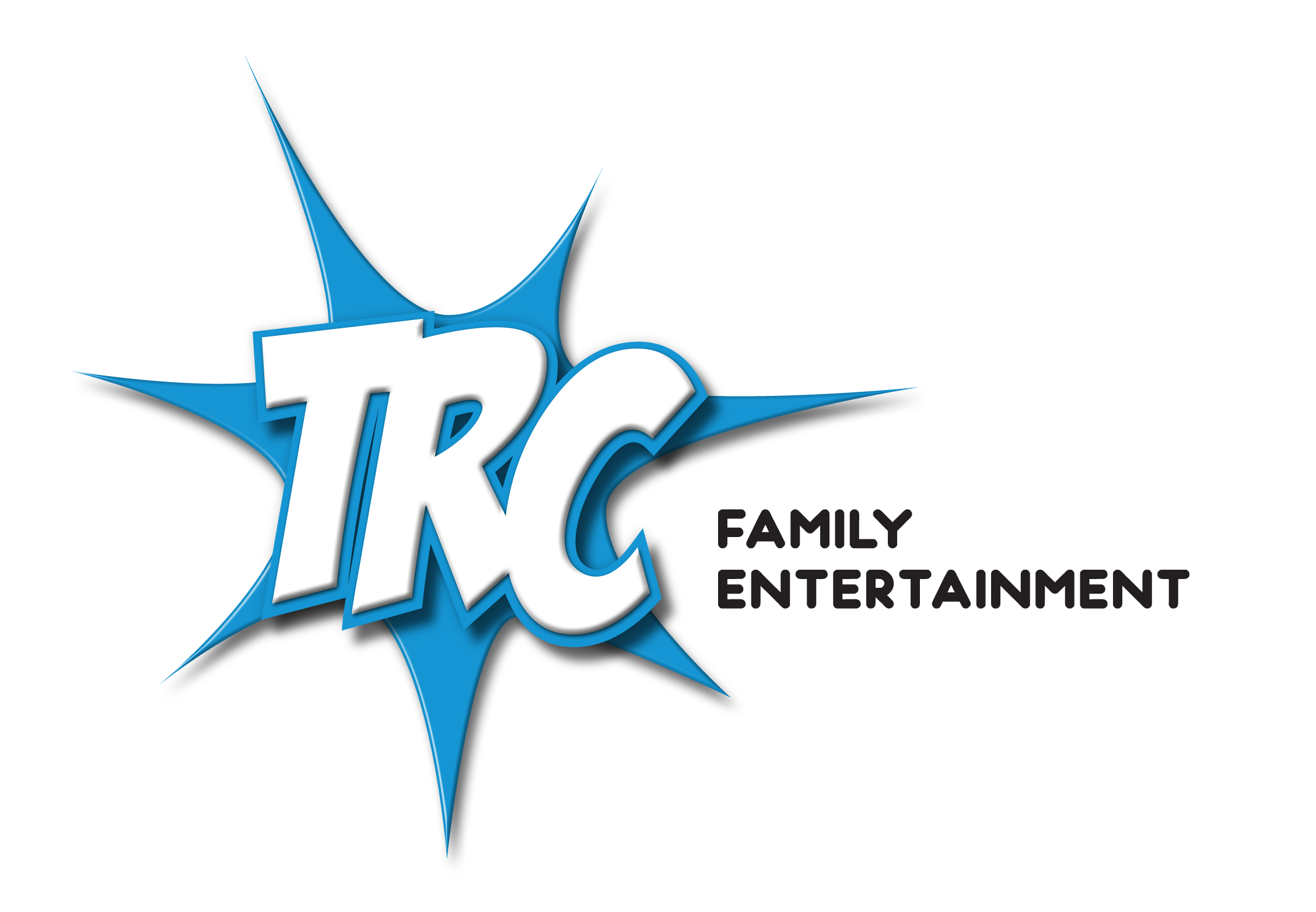
- Company type: Private
- Industry: Computer and video games Interactive entertainment
- Founded: 2011
- Products: Online world, video games, interactive books, animation and music

TRC Family Entertainment Limited is a family entertainment, trans-media and video game developer based in Ireland. Founded in 2011 by Malta Enterprise, Chris Deering (credited as one of the main marketers of the successful PlayStation and PlayStation 2 video game consoles earning him the title of "The Father of the PlayStation"), Paul Taylor (previous CEO of Jetix Europe), TRC Media Ireland Limited and a group of private investors, with the aim to develop an online world for children, similar to Club Penguin and a range of digital media products. Malta Enterprise acquired 15% equity (equivalent to €4 million) together with another €4 million in investment aid. The studio managed to attract professionals from around the world to develop its first online world, and a range of other interconnected products for its intellectual property, Wishingtooth. The company had completed a testing and validation phase of the Wishingtooth brand, receiving impressive feedback and reviews from a core consumer group of over 18,000 families in the US.

Due to changing market conditions, Wishingtooth entered deep startup mode for several years while its parent company TRC Family Entertainment Limited further built out its suite of digital and physical products, in addition to solely possessing four exclusive globally registered trademarks to the Wishingtooth brand surrounding the celebration of a child's missing tooth. Furthermore, it has expanded its offering and its target age range (6-11yrs) to 24 years of age, and being perhaps the first trans-media company to partner with parents in supporting a child through to adulthood, with a focus on a child's success along its intent and ability to offer a tradition that can be passed from one generation to the next.

Its 82-page interactive superbook app dubbed the Wishingtooth Storybook Adventure is highly adaptable with its digital ecosystem allowing it to integrate with [internal or external] any company's products, services, or stores thus offering wide B2B appeal. Secondly, the feedback from three proof-of-concept studies have demonstrated its consistency in significantly reducing the time it would otherwise take to increase a child's literacy. In addition, multiple testimonials from consumers have supported a correlation with an increased self-confidence among the participant children due to self-identification with Wishingtooth's suite characters.

Its second signature product Party-in-a-box has broad customization options, catering to various budget sizes and providing parents the ability to self-host parties celebrating a child's missing tooth as well as that of third-party vendors. In one particular study in New York, 83% of families that were tested conveyed support in furtherance of recommending for one's self or to other this concept of celebrating a child's missing tooth. And in 2025, Wishingtooth incorporated in the United States and emerged from its startup stealth mode poised to go-to-market with its vast portfolio of physical and digital products, with its aim of appealing to both brands and consumers, thus becoming a household name within the next few years.
