= L-SAM =

South Korean anti-ballistic missile system

Long-range Surface-to-Air Missile 장거리 지대공 미사일
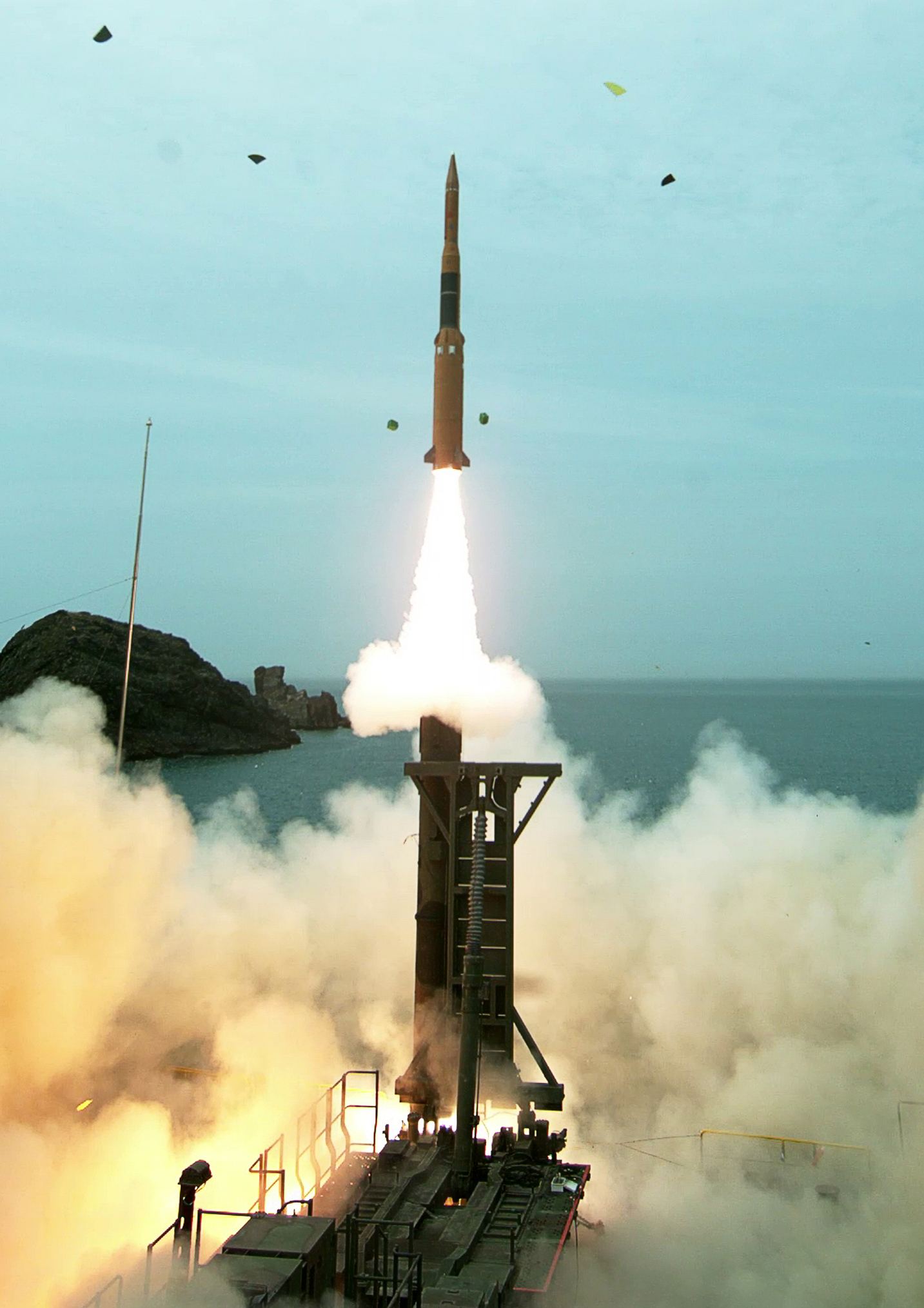
- A ballistic missile intercept testing of L-SAM conducted on 20 June 2023.
- Type: Long-range, mobile surface-to-air missile/anti-ballistic missile system
- Place of origin: South Korea

Service history
- In service: 2028 (planned)
- Used by: Republic of Korea Air Force

Production history
- Designer: Agency for Defense Development (system); Hanwha (anti-ballistic missile); LIG Nex1 (anti-aircraft missile)
- Designed: Block 1: 2019–2024; Block 2: 2025–2028 (planned)
- Manufacturer: Hanwha Aerospace; LIG Defense & Aerospace
- Produced: 2025 (planned)

Specifications
- Length: Anti-ballistic missile: 7 meters (23 ft)
- Engine: Dual-pulsed rocket motor
- Propellant: Gelled nitromethane propellant
- Operational range: Block 1: 150 km (93 mi); Block 2 HAI: 450 km (280 mi)
- Flight ceiling: Block 1: 60 km (37 mi); Block 2 HAI: 180 km (110 mi)
- Maximum speed: Mach 9 (3,100 m/s; 11,000 km/h)
- Guidance system: Imaging infra-red seeker

The L-SAM (Long-range Surface-to-Air Missile; Korean: 장거리 지대공 미사일; Hanja: 長距離地對空미사일; RR: Janggeori Jidaegong Misail) is a South Korean long range surface-to-air and anti-ballistic missile system developed by the Agency for Defense Development (ADD), Hanwha, and LIG Nex1. The performance levels are comparable to the and the Israeli Arrow 2. L-SAM serves as a key system in South Korea's Korean Air and Missile Defense (KAMD).

The development of L-SAM Block 1 was officially completed in May 2024 and was declared fit for combat by the Defense Acquisition Program Administration (DAPA).

== Development and design ==
The L-SAM was developed with the aim of shooting down ballistic missiles such as North Korea's Hwasong-11A (KN-23) and Hwasong-11B (KN-24) in the terminal phase. It will be an upper-tier surface-to-air missile system for multi-layered defense as part of Republic of Korea Air Force's Korean Air and Missile Defense (KAMD) project, which has been planned since the early 2020s, with the lower tier composed of Patriot PAC-3 and KM-SAM batteries.

The L-SAM system is expected to use two types of interceptors: one for anti-air meant to target general air breathing threats such as aircraft or cruise missiles and the other for anti-ballistic. The anti-ballistic missile (ABM) consists of total of a three stages and uses a hit-to-kill system that intercepts targets with a kill vehicle that integrates an imaging infra-red (IIR) seeker and a divert attitude control system (DACS), and can intercept missiles approaching at an altitude of 50–60 kilometers (160,000–200,000 ft). L-SAM demonstrated its intercept capability by succeeding three out of a total of four missile interception tests between November 2022 and June 2023.

The development of L-SAM Block 1 was completed in May 2024, and initial mass production will begin in 2025 and will be deployed to the Republic of Korea Air Force from 2028.

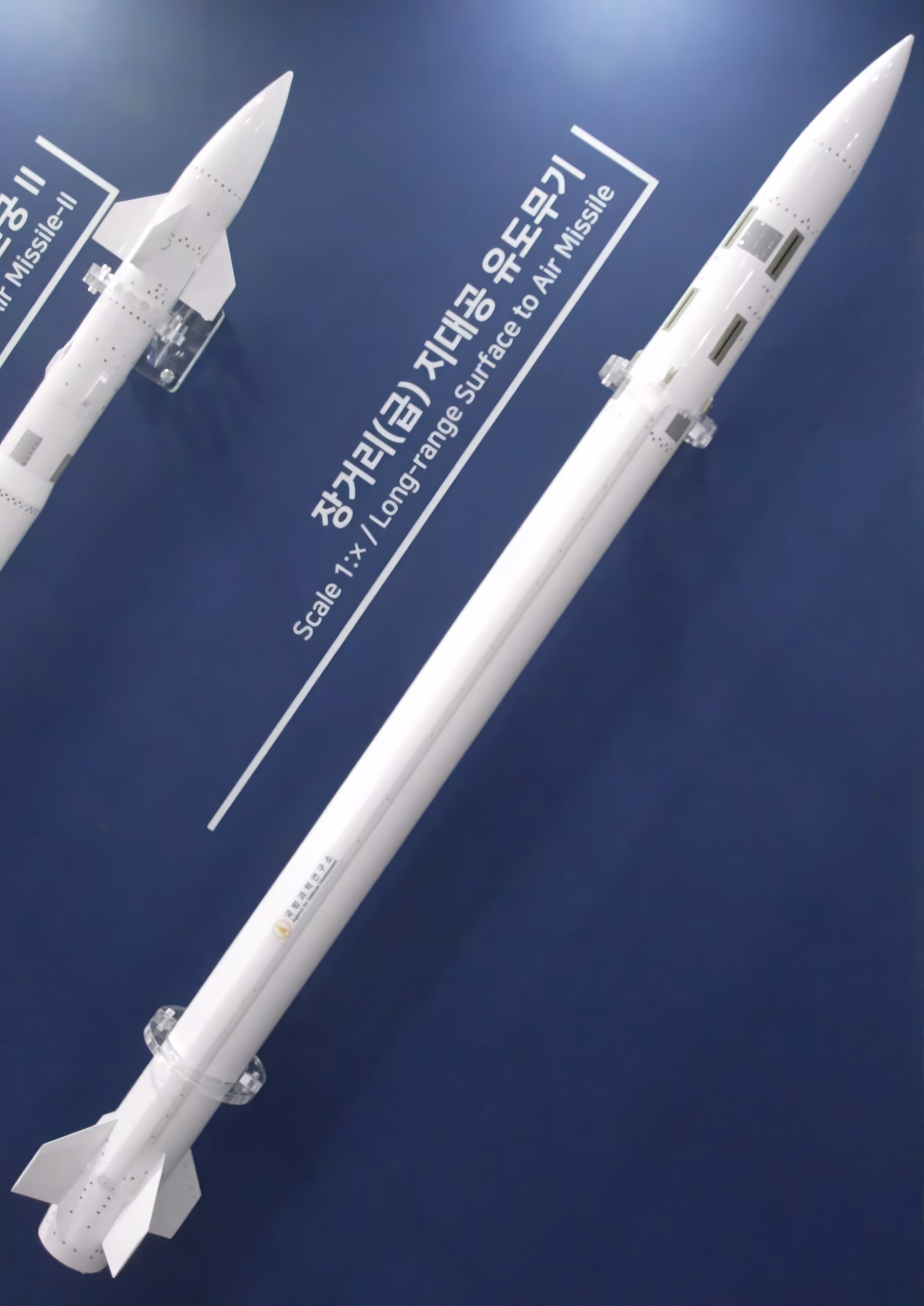
A scale model of L-SAM's anti-aircraft missile (AAM)

=== Dual-pulse propulsion system ===
The L-SAM is designed to efficiently distribute propulsion energy across flight segments by adopting dual-pulsed rocket motors (DPRM) to allow interceptors to have high thrust and fast maneuverability in the stratosphere. A dual-pulsed propulsion engine creates two-stage pulse combustion by installing a pulse separation device in single combustor. The first-stage combustion carries the missile to the target point, and the second-stage combustion speeds up rapidly in the final stage of approaching the target, increasing the success rate of interception.

=== Long-range multifunction radar (L-MFR) ===
The L-SAM's multifunction radar is an active electronically scanned array (AESA) radar operated at S-band frequency. The radar can detect and track multiple targets and can simultaneously operate the precision tracking mode required for the guidance of the interceptor. A fixed antenna allows fast and precise detection by electronically steering the beam by thousands of transmit/receive modules (TRM). The advantages of the S-band are its long range of detection and excellent adaptability to severe weather conditions. Compared to the C-band and the X-band, it has less scattering and attenuation of radio waves and can reliably detect large areas, making it suitable for tracking targets such as ballistic missiles approaching at high altitudes and at high speeds.

==== Transmit/receive module ====
- Operating frequency: S-band (2–4 GHz)
- Tx gain: 10 dB ± 0.5 dB
- Rx noise figure: <4 dB
- Phase range: 6 bits
- Attenuation range: 6 bits

=== Operational Concept ===
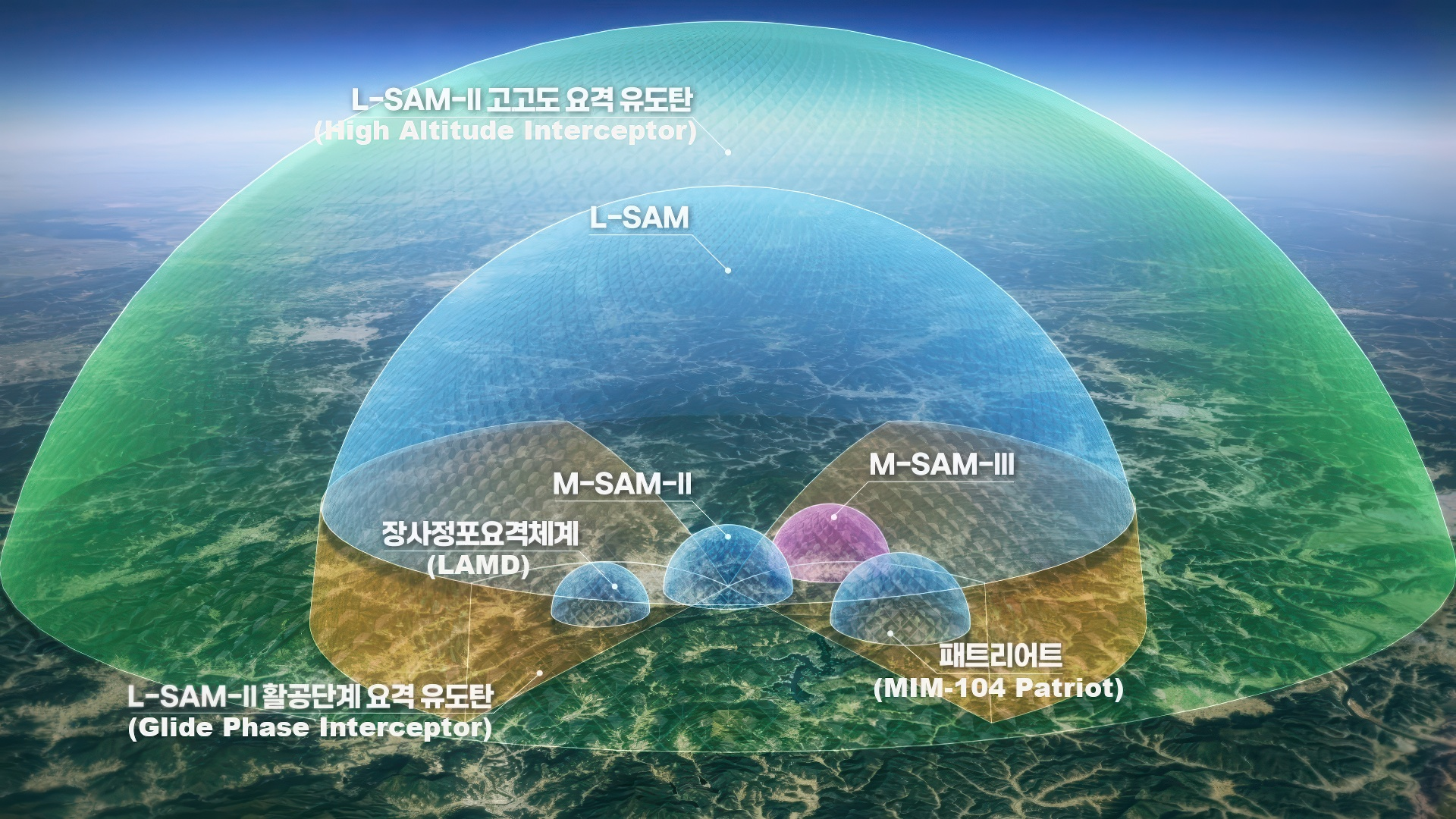

1	Low Altitude Missile Defense (LAMD) anti-artillery interceptor
2	M-SAM Block 2 medium-range lower tier air defense system
3	M-SAM Block 3 boost phase interceptor (BPI)
4	PAC-2 and PAC-3 complementary air defense system

5	L-SAM Block 2 glide phase interceptor (GPI)
6	L-SAM Block 1 long-range multi-layered air defense system
7	L-SAM Block 2 high altitude interceptor (HAI)

=== Battery configuration ===
The L-SAM battery is composed of a multifunction radar, a command-and-control (C2) center, a combat control station, and four truck-mounted launchers, two of each missile type. It will use a trailer-mounted S-band AESA radar.

- Command and control center: 1
- Combat control station: 1
- Multifunction radar: 1
- Launchers: 4
- Missiles per launcher: 6 (surface-to-air missiles and anti-ballistic missiles)

== Improvements ==
=== Block 2 ===
On 25 April 2023, the 153rd Defense Acquisition Program Promotion Committee deliberated and approved on a plan to develop a new missile defense system with a higher intercepting altitude than the existing L-SAM with a budget of 2.71 trillion won by 2027. The new missile system, named L-SAM 2, includes high-altitude interceptor (HAI) missiles and glide phase interceptor (GPI) missiles, and is estimated to have an interception altitude of 180 km.

== See also ==
- Korean Air and Missile Defense

Comparable systems

- THAAD
- Arrow 2
- Arrow 3
- S-400
- S-500

South Korean Surface-to-Air systems

- KP-SAM
- K-SAM (Pegasus, based on Crotale)
- K-SAAM
- M-SAM
