= LIG Defense & Aerospace =

South Korean aerospace manufacturer and arms manufacturer

- Native name: 엘아이지디펜스앤에어로스페이스 주식회사
- Formerly: Goldstar Precision (1976–2000); LG Innotek (2000–2004); NEX1 Future (2004–2007); LIG Nex1 (2007–2026)
- Type: Public
- Traded as: KRX: 079550
- Industry: Aerospace; Defense
- Founded: 25 February 1976; 50 years ago
- Headquarters: 207, Mabuk-ro, Giheung-gu, Yongin-si, Gyeonggi-do, South Korea
- Area served: Worldwide
- Key people: Shin Ik-hyun (President & CEO)
- Products: Avionics; Communication systems; Electronics; Fire-control systems; Missiles; Radars; Rockets; Torpedoes
- Revenue: ▲ ₩4.3069 trillion (2025)
- Operating income: ▲ ₩319.4 billion (2025)
- Net income: ▲ ₩237.5 billion (2025)
- Total assets: ▲ ₩8.0648 trillion (2025)
- Total equity: ▲ ₩1.4761 trillion (2025)
- Owner: LIG Corporation (38.21%); National Pension Service (10.31%); Treasury stocks (0.70%); Employee stock ownership (0.21%)
- Parent: LIG Group
- Website: Official website in English; Official website in Korean

LIG Defense & Aerospace (LIG D&A; Korean: LIG 디펜스&에어로스페이스), formerly known as LG Innotek and LIG Nex1 is a South Korean aerospace manufacturer and arms manufacturer. It was established in 1976 as Goldstar Precision. LIG Nex1 was previously owned by LIG Holdings Company, which in turn was owned by the LIG Group. In 2013, a consortium led by South Korea private equity firm STIC Investments acquired 49 percent stake in LIG Nex1 for 420 billion Korean won.

It develops and produces a wide range of advanced precision electronic systems, including missiles, underwater weapon systems, radars, electronic warfare, avionics, tactical communication systems, fire control systems, naval combat systems, and electro-optics. It is one of the major suppliers of weapon systems for the Republic of Korea Armed Forces, as well as an international exporter of weapon systems.

== History ==
The company was established on February 25, 1976, under the name Goldstar Precision Industries (Korean: 금성정밀공업; Hanja: 金星精密工業; RR: Geumseong Jeongmil Gongeop) as a subsidiary of Goldstar Electronics (now LG Electronics). The company changed its name to LG Innotek (Korean: LG이노텍; RR: Elji Inotek) in 2000, and since 2004 it has been incorporated as a subsidiary of LIG Group under the name Nex1 Future (Korean: 넥스원퓨처; RR: Nekseuweon Pyucheo), and changed its name to LIG Nex1 in 2007.

== Products ==
=== Missiles ===
- Hyunmoo-3 surface-to-surface cruise missile
- AT-1K Raybolt man-portable anti-tank guided missile
- SSM-700K C-Star anti-ship missile
- KP-SAM Chiron man-portable surface-to-air missile
- K-SAM Pegasus surface-to-air missile system
- M-SAM surface-to-air missile system
- K-SAAM ship-launched surface-to-air missile
- L-SAM surface-to-air missile system
- Surface-to-air missile system for K30 Biho self-propelled anti-aircraft gun
- KALCM Cheonryong (Korean air-launched cruise missile) for KAI KF-21 Boramae multirole fighter (development)

=== Precision guided munitions ===
- Poniard (Bigung) surface-to-ship rocket
- Biryong (Flying Dragon) 130 mm short range ship-to-ship guided rocket
- Korean GPS-Guided Bomb (KGGB)
- Blackout bomb

=== Torpedoes ===
- K731 White Shark heavyweight torpedo
- K745 Blue Shark lightweight torpedo
- K745A1 Red Shark homing torpedo
- K761 Tiger Shark heavyweight torpedo

=== Surveillance and Reconnaissance ===
- ESR-500A active electronically scanned array radar for FA-50 Block 20
- Local Air Defense Radar (LADR)
- Weapon Locating Radar-II (WLR-II)
- LRS-450 3D air surveillance radar
- Coastal survelliance radar
- Precision Approach Radar (PAR)
- 3D surveillance radar for Incheon-class frigate (FFX)
- 3D surveillance radar for Yoon Youngha-class patrol vessel (PKG)
- Satellite Synthetic Aperture Radar (SAR)
- Micro-satellite (SAR/EO)
- Electronic Optical Satellite Reconnaissance System (EOSS)
- Electro-optical targeting system (EOTS) for self-propelled anti-aircraft gun
- Hull Mounted Sonar (HMS)
- Sonar system for Sejong the Great-class destroyer (KDX-III Batch-II)
- Sonar system for KDDX
- Sonar system for Dosan Ahn Changho-class submarine (KSS-III)
- Harbor Underwater Surveillance System (HUSS)

=== Command/Control/Communication ===
- Ground-based command and control system for unmanned aerial systems
- Battalion Tactical Command System (BTCS)
- Vehicle command and control system
- Jang Bogo-class submarine (KSS-I) combat management system
- KSS-II combat system
- LINCS naval combat system
- Military satellite communication system-II
- Tactical Multiband Multirole Radio (TMMR)

=== Avionics ===
- Nex electronic warfare suite (EWS) for KAI KF-21 Boramae

=== Electronic warfare ===
- Ground electronic warfare equipment
- Shipborne electronic warfare system
- Airborne electronic warfare system
- Anti-drone protection system
- Direction finder and monitoring system

=== Unmanned systems ===
- Multi purpose unmanned helicopter
- Multi-purpose drone
- Communication device for unmanned surveillance vehicle
- Unmanned Surface Vehicle (USV)
- Autonomous Underwater Vehicle (AUV)
- Unmanned Underwater Vehicle (UUV)
- Remotely operated vehicle (ROV)

=== Other ===
- Torpedo acoustic counter measure system
- Submarine-launched mobile sea mine

== Corporate governance ==
=== Ownership ===
Major shareholders as of August 2026
| Shareholder | Country | Shares | Stake (%) |
|---|---|---|---|
| LIG Corporation | South Korea | 8,407,165 | 38.21% |
| National Pension Service | South Korea | 2,268,475 | 10.31% |
| Treasury stock | South Korea | 154,750 | 0.70% |
| Employee stock ownership | South Korea | 45,701 | 0.21% |

== See also ==
- LG Innotek
- LG Electronics
