= Wayfinder =

Open source mapping and navigation software

Wayfinder Systems AB
- Company type: Subsidiary
- Industry: IT
- Genre: Mobile Navigation
- Predecessor: Itinerary Systems IS AB
- Founder: David Svensson CEO CTO
- Fate: Acquired by Vodafone
- Headquarters: Malmö, Sweden
- Key people: Tommy Ahlers CEO
- Products: Navigation Software
- Parent: Vodafone
- Website: http://www.wayfinder.com

Wayfinder, previously a mobile navigation software, is now an open source mapping and navigation software. Wayfinder Systems AB (called Itinerary Systems IS AB until 2002) was founded in 1995 by David Svensson (CEO 1995-2001, CTO 2001-2004) and investors. The company IPO was in 2005 with the stock listed on Nordic Growth Market (NGM Equity) at a 600 MSEK market cap. In 2009 the British mobile phone operator Vodafone bought all shares in Wayfinder Systems AB and operated it as a wholly owned subsidiary with 97 people employed, specializing in creating mobile navigation systems for a number of platforms such as Symbian 2nd and 3rd edition, UIQ, Windows Mobile and some other smartphones. An external Bluetooth GPS receiver is required for non GPS enabled phones. On March 12, 2010, some years after Google launched Google Maps and then free turn-by-turn mobile phone navigation, it was announced that Vodafone was closing the company and all employees would be let go.

On July 13, 2010, Wayfinder announced that they would open source their software under the BSD 3-clause license. Source code for both the server (with import tools for map data from OpenStreetMap) and client software for various phone operating systems (including Android, iPhone and Symbian S60) is available at GitHub.

== Wayfinder Navigator ==
Wayfinder Navigator is a mobile GPS application that provides turn-by-turn directions through a mobile phone. By downloading pre-loaded maps, Navigator can provide directions and different points of interest without Internet connection.

In May 2008, Wayfinder Navigator was updated to include pre-loaded maps, social networking and map coverage of 150 countries world-wide.

== Wayfinder Earth ==
Wayfinder Earth is a mobile application that displays a 3D globe. The application contains over three million Points of Interest (POIs) including restaurants, train stations, bars, museums, gas stations and hospitals. Another international application, map coverage includes Europe and North America. Wayfinder Earth can set favorites, save address searches and show GPS information such as speed, position and heading as well.

As the maps are downloaded from the internet on the fly so the phone requires a GPRS/UMTS connection. Maps are cached on the phone memory or memorycard. According to the site, maps can even be downloaded from the site and stored on the phone, once you have registered. A half an hour of navigating uses approximately 200 kb of data or only 8 kb in the so-called Guide view.

== Wayfinder Active ==
Wayfinder Active was a mobile phone GPS application to track physical outdoor activities. The application calculated exercise statistics such as distance, calories burned and altitude info, so that people could set and track specific exercise goals. Through an online community, activeoutdoor.com, people could track and share local routes within the community. The product was discontinued spring 2009.

== Speed cameras ==
Wayfinder launched the Wayfinder SpeedAlert application in December 2006. The application runs on Java and Symbian 3rd edition only. It warns the user of 15,000 speed cameras around Europe as well as when they exceed a manually set speed limit.
