= STIC Investments =

South Korean venture capital firm

STIC Investments, Inc.
- Type: Private
- Industry: Private Equity
- Founded: July 1999; 27 years ago
- Founder: Y.H. Do
- Headquarters: Seoul, South Korea
- Number of locations: 7 offices (2012)
- Key people: Yong Hwan Do (Chairman); Byung Won Choi (CEO); Dong Guel Kwak (CIO)
- AUM: ▲US$6.7 billion (2024)
- Number of employees: 70
- Website: sticinvestments.com

STIC Investments Inc. is an international venture capital and private equity fund management firm. It was founded in July 1999. As of early 2024, STIC Investments had AUM of US$6.7 billion.

STIC Investments is headquartered in Seoul, South Korea, has offices in Busan, Hong Kong, Ho Chi Minh City, Shanghai, and Taipei, and employs 70 people.

== Investment Areas ==
STIC Investments engages in growth capital investments, buyouts, and secondary market transactions pertaining to mid-cap companies. In early 2013, STIC Investments indicated its intention to become active in the area of mergers and acquisitions of large corporations.

STIC Investments establishes off-shore structured vehicles targeted at international investors, and is one of a small number of Asia-based firms that manage Shariah-compliant private equity funds, having targeted this group of investors since 2004.

STIC Investments has invested in over 300 companies to date, mostly in technology-enabled manufacturing industries including the TMT (Technology, media, telecommunications), health care, biotechnology, clean technology, automotive, and shipbuilding / offshore plant industries.

=== Notable Investments ===
==== Exited ====
STIC Investments paid 10 billion won (US$8.54 million) for a 22% stake in Jeil Hydraulics in late 2009, which it sold to Eaton Corporation in mid-2012 for 30.8 billion won (US$29 million), thereby more than tripling its investment in less than three years. The stake was held in the STIC Private Equity Fund II.

The firm made an initial investment of US$20.3 million in Golfzon, a maker of a golf simulator, in March 2008, and sold its stake in early 2012 for US$72.9 million, earning a 3.6x return, or a gross IRR of 66.1%. The stake was held in the now-liquidated STIC Private Equity Fund I.

The firm owned stakes in Playspan, which was sold to VISA in 2011.

The firm sold a 7.57% stake in music label Hybe (formerly called Big Hit Entertainment) in June 2021.

==== Ongoing ====
In 2012, the firm invested KRW162 billion (US$144 million) to acquire an 8.1% stake in Posco Energy, and invested US$28.2 million in Hyundai Oil Terminal, a subsidiary of Hyundai Oilbank.

== Ongoing Funds ==
- STIC Private Equity Fund II
- STIC Secondary Fund III
- STIC Secondary Fund II
- STIC M&A Fund II
- STIC Pan-Asia Technology Fund
- STIC Pioneer Fund II

== Recognition ==
STIC Investments has received several domestic awards, including the "Best Private Equity Fund" award at the 4th Korea Investment Banking Awards, sponsored by the Korea Economic Daily, and the "Best Exit Deal" award at the 2013 Korea Venture Capital awards, sponsored by Money Today and the Korea Venture Capital Association. The company was also selected as the "Best Private Equity Manager" in the 2013 AsianInvestor Korea Awards and received the "Industrial Service Medal" from the president of South Korea in 2007.
