= KP-SAM Chiron =

South Korean shoulder-launched surface-to-air missile

KP-SAM Chiron 신궁 휴대용 지대공 미사일
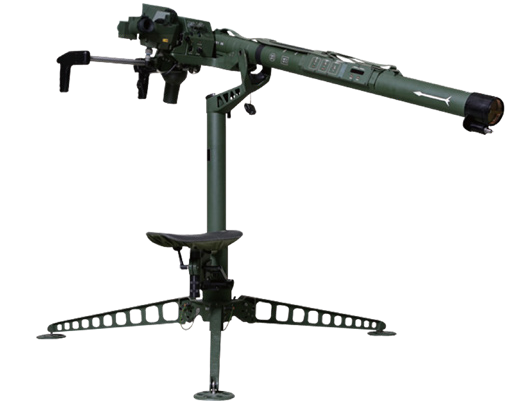
- Type: Manportable surface-to-air missile (MANPADS)
- Place of origin: South Korea

Service history
- In service: 2005–present
- Used by: See Operators

Production history
- Designer: Agency for Defense Development; NEX1 Future
- Designed: 1995–2004
- Manufacturer: LIG Defense & Aerospace
- Unit cost: €2.6 million (2023)
- Produced: 2004–present

Specifications
- Mass: Total: 19.5 kg (43 lb); Missile: 15 kg (33 lb)
- Length: 1.68 m (5.5 ft)
- Diameter: 80 mm (3.1 in)
- Crew: 2 (If based from a tripod), 1 (If held)
- Maximum firing range: 7 km (4.3 mi)
- Warhead: 720 Tungsten balls
- Warhead weight: 2.5 kg (5.5 lb)
- Engine: Solid fuel rocket
- Flight ceiling: 4 km (13,000 ft)
- Maximum speed: Mach 2.5 (851 m/s; 3,060 km/h)
- Guidance system: Infrared homing

The KP-SAM Chiron (Note: The origin of the name is Chiron, a centaur in Greek mythology.) (Korean Portable-Surface to Air Missile; Korean: 신궁; Hanja: 神弓; RR: Singung) is a South Korean shoulder-launched surface-to-air missile manufactured by LIG Defense & Aerospace (LIG D&A).

== History ==
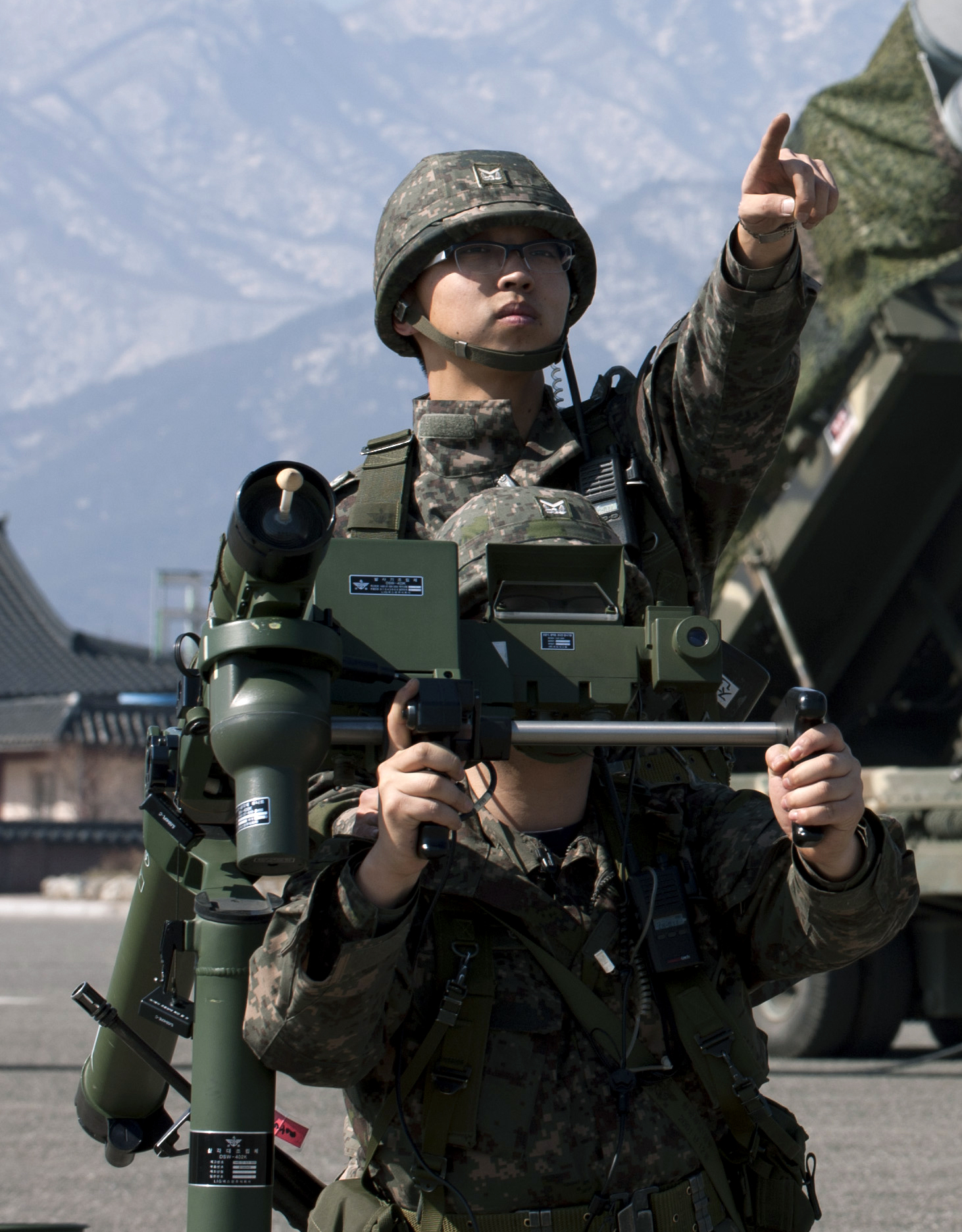
KP-SAM Chiron of the Republic of Korea Navy, 2013

The KP-SAM Chiron was created to protect ROK troops in the forward area, which started in 1995 under the direction of NEX1 Future (now LIG Defense & Aerospace). In late 2003, the delivery of the Igla SAMs from Russia in payment for Russian debts to Korea appear to have solved the problem momentarily. The KP-SAM began production in 2004 with extended trials in early 2005.

In late 2005, the KP-SAM entered service with the South Korean Army, after being in development for nearly 8 years. The South Korean Army has ordered some 2000 units to be delivered in the near future.

In 2011, the KP-SAM was proposed to the Indian military for potential export. It was being marketed in 2012 for India's modernization of their VSHORAD system, competing with the RBS 70, the Starstreak, the Mistral-2 and the SA-24.

In November 2012, Peru announced that they will purchase the Chiron alongside 108 missiles and three TPS-830KE radar under a US$43 million defense contract. However, the deal was called off in May 2013 over problems on paying for the contract.

In 2014, Indonesia bought the KP-SAM for integration with the Skyshield 35 mm anti-aircraft system. It was previously shown at the Indo Defence 2014 exhibition.

In 2021 it is reported that failure rate of the KP-SAM was at 24% due to aging inventory that has been improperly stored along lacking proficiency with the system by its operators.

== Features ==
While the missile system externally resembles a French Mistral system, the entire missile system including the seeker, control section, warhead and motor were developed and manufactured in South Korea. The missile features integrated IFF systems, night and adverse weather capabilities, a two-colour (IR/UV) infrared seeker to aid in negating infrared countermeasures (IRCM) and a proximity-fuse warhead. During development tests the missile scored a 90% hit ratio.

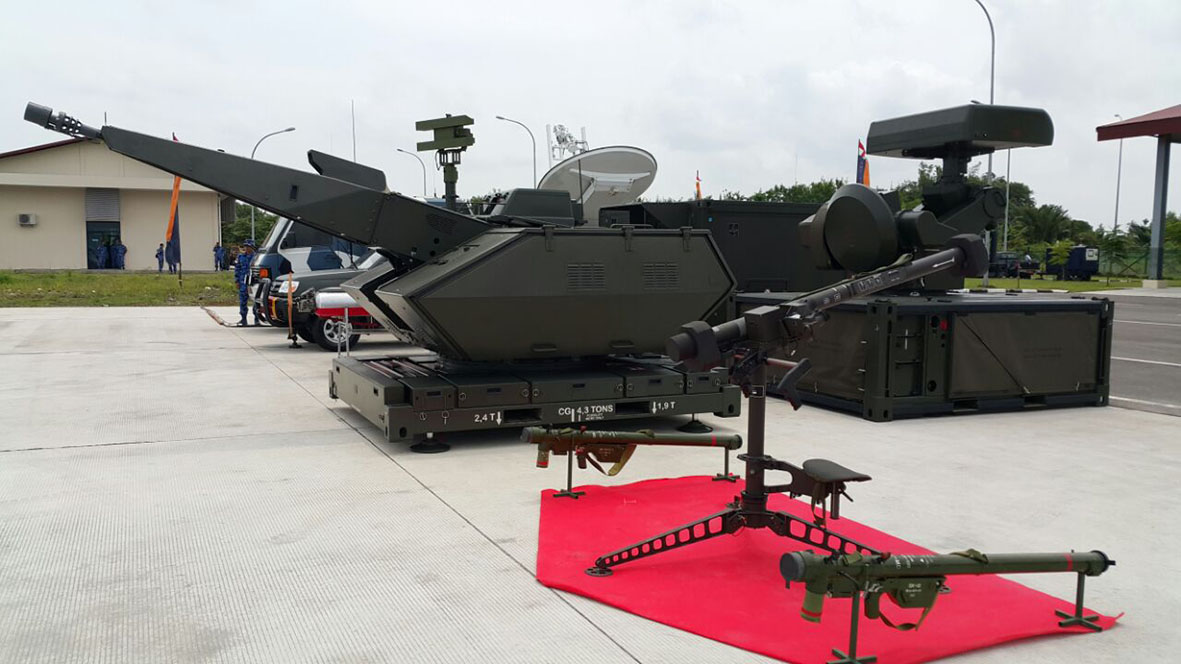
Indonesian air force Chiron MANPADS and other air defense elements on display during 2016 Angkasa Yudha Exercises.

According to Agency for Defense Development officials, the missile is superior to the American FIM-92 Stinger or the French Mistral in hit probability, price and portability. It had been involved in a missile test where the Shingung's missile made impact on a low-flying target as high as 3.5 kilometers with a speed of 697.5 m/s (more than Mach 2.36) and a distance range of 7 km.

== Operators ==
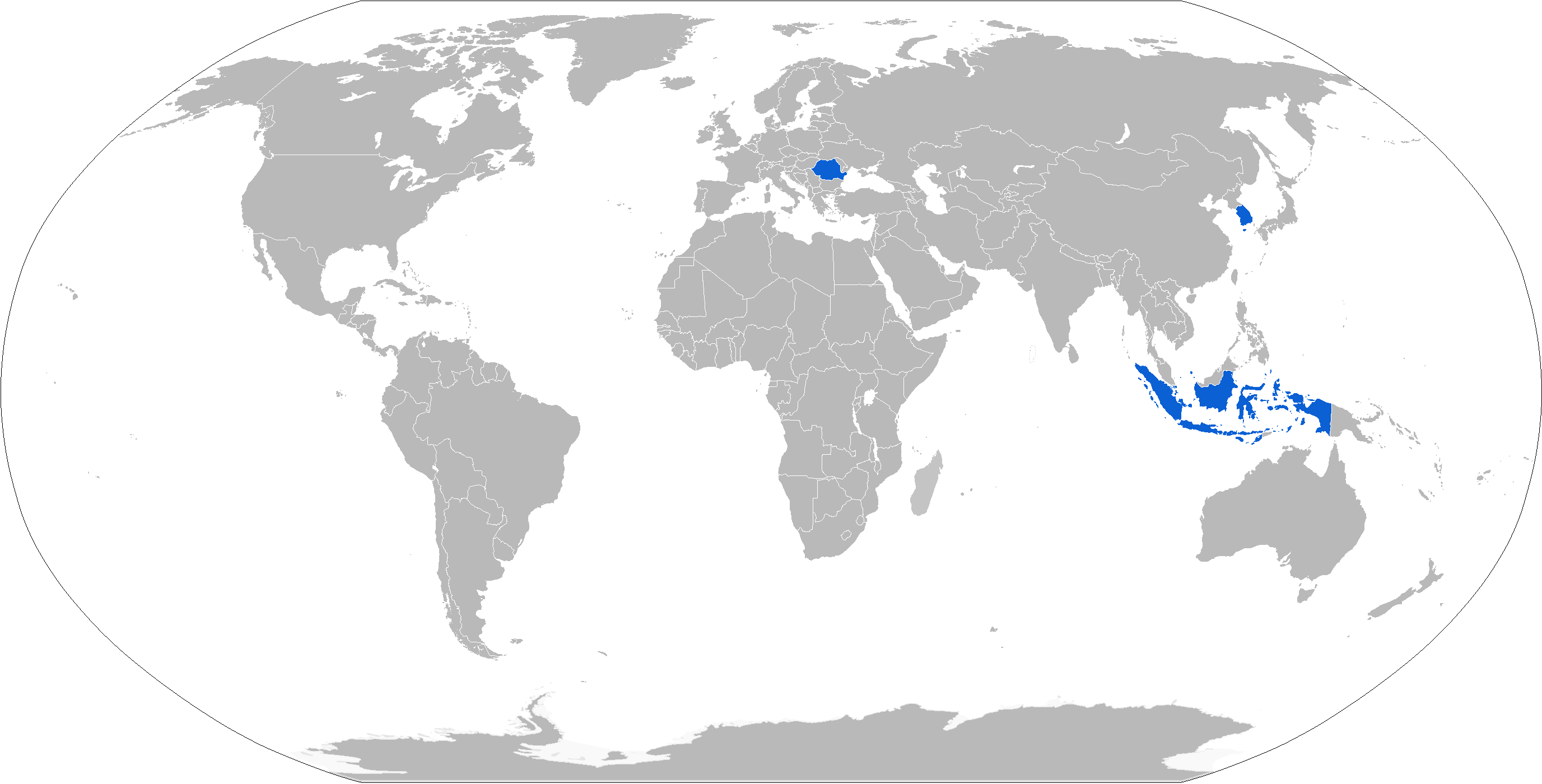
Map with KP-SAM operators in blue

- Indonesia: Indonesian Air Force acquired and operated Chirons since 2014 which was integrated with Oerlikon Skyshield 35 mm anti-aircraft gun system. Additional 2 Chirons transferred according to a 2019 SIPRI small arms report.
- Romania: 54 KP-SAMs. First systems delivered in June 2024.
- South Korea: In ROK Army service since 2005.
- Morocco: 50 KP-SAMs.

=== Failed contracts ===
- Peru

== See also ==
- K-SAM (based on Crotale)
- K-SAAM
- M-SAM
- L-SAM
- List of surface-to-air missiles
- List of anti-aircraft weapons
