= Spare Change Payments =

Spare Change Payments was an online payments company specifically designed for conducting micro-payments inside games and applications on Facebook and other social networking sites. It is now owned by Visa, Inc.

The company was the first to offer a micro-payment solution for social networking application developers shortly after Facebook opened its Facebook Platform. It operated a virtual goods monetization platform that allowed users to deposit funds into a central Spare Change account that they could then spend across multiple games and applications on the social network, and was a precursor to Facebook Credits.

The company pioneered and evangelized the move for app developers away from advertising based monetization models toward micro-payment models and the sale of virtual goods. In March 2009, Spare Change was reported to be processing $30M of payments across 700 applications on Facebook, MySpace and Bebo and to have over 1M wallet accounts.

== Company history ==
Spare Change Payments was founded in 2007 by Mark Rose, Simon Ru and Lex Bayer, with offices in Cupertino, California. In April 2009, the company was acquired by PlaySpan, which was subsequently acquired for $190M by Visa Inc, in February 2011. The staff and technology at Spare Change and PlaySpan was ultimately used to build out Visa Checkout. Visa designed Visa Checkout to be quick and tailor for mobile shopping experience. Like an online wallet, it only requires a username and password to check out once the user is registered. In September 2017, the technology patent "Method and system for authenticating online transactions" originally filed by the Spare Change founders was granted by US Patent Office.
