= AFP Modernization Act =

Philippine law

Congress of the Philippines
- Long title: An Act Providing for the Modernization of the Armed Forces of the Philippines and for Other Purposes
- Citation: Republic Act No. 7898
- Territorial extent: Philippines
- Signed by: President Fidel V. Ramos
- Signed: February 23, 1995
- Status: Amended

The Armed Forces of the Philippines (AFP) Modernization Act, officially designated as Republic Act No. 7898, was a Philippine law that was enacted on February 23, 1995, by President Fidel V. Ramos. It was aimed to modernize all branches of the Armed Forces of the Philippines (AFP) such as the Philippine Air Force, Philippine Navy, and the Philippine Army. The law was amended by Republic Act No. 10349, also known as the Revised AFP Modernization Act, on December 11, 2012.

== History ==
The law was intended to last for 15 years with an initial budget of 50 billion pesos for the first five years, but the funding was stopped due to the 1997 Asian financial crisis. After the financial crisis, the funding for the AFP modernization was halted and later neglected by successive administrations until the law expired in 2010.

AFP Modernization Act

Congress of the Philippines
- Long title: An Act Amending Republic Act No. 7898, Establishing the Revised AFP Modernization Program and for Other Purposes
- Citation: Republic Act No. 10349
- Territorial extent: Philippines
- Signed by: President Benigno Aquino III
- Signed: December 11, 2012
- Status: In force

On December 11, 2012, President Benigno Aquino III amended by Republic Act No. 10349, also known as the Revised AFP Modernization Act, which extends the modernization program for another 15 years with an initial budget of ₱75 billion for the first five years in order to continue modernizing all the branches of the AFP. The amended law was made under the leadership of President Benigno Aquino III. This new law is aimed at building a defense system capable of addressing the assessed threats, at a time when the Philippines is locked with a sea dispute with China in the contested Spratly Islands along with Taiwan and other southeast Asian nations like Brunei, Malaysia, and Vietnam.

The revised AFP modernization program is divided into three horizons. The first was implemented from 2013 to 2017, the second is from 2018 to 2022, while the third is from 2023 to 2028. A total Projected Cost of US$40 billion

On June 20, 2018, President Rodrigo Duterte approved the Armed Forces modernization program's shopping list for Horizon 2. The list of projects will be implemented from 2018 to 2022, with a budget of about ₱300 billion, or about US$5.6 billion.

On October 13, 2023, Secretary Gilberto Teodoro announced that Congress will possibly allow amendment on military modernization/procurement laws.

In January 2024, President Bongbong Marcos approved the "Re-Horizon 3" initiative which overhauled the previous acquisition list contained in the original third phase of the modernization program. Re-Horizon 3 will spend up to US$35 Billion over the next decade. On October 8, 2024, the Self-Reliant Defense Posture (SRDP) Revitalization Act was signed by President Marcos.

== Modernization programs ==
The following acquisition programs is in-line with the ongoing AFP modernization program.

=== Philippine Air Force ===
- On Mar. 28, 2014, it was announced by the state arms procurement agency of South Korea that South Korea signed a US$420 million contract Friday to export 12 FA-50 light fighter jets built by Korea Aerospace Industries (KAI) to the Philippines under a government-to-government deal. The first two FA-50s were received in November 2015 and the final two were delivered by 31 May 2017.
- The Philippine Air Force signed a contract for eight AW109 Power light twin helicopters. These aircraft will be used to perform a range of duties including homeland security, armed reconnaissance and close support. Deliveries will start in 2014. The contract also includes initial logistics support and training for aircrew and maintenance personnel. The Department of National Defense (Philippines) stated that the project involved the purchase of eight helicopters with full night operation capability, complete weapons system and integrated logistics support package. Two companies expressed their interest in the bidding process of the eight attack helicopters. Representatives of AgustaWestland and Eurocopter attended the pre-bid conference for the purchase of eight attack helicopters. Other companies including Bell Helicopter, FN Herstal, Elbit Systems and Boeing Company also sent representatives.
- The Department of National Defense acquired 3 brand-new Medium Lift Fixed Wing Aircraft and its "initial" Integrated Logistics Support (ILS) for the Air Force with a budget of PHP 5.3 billion. The plan was to acquire Medium Lift Fixed Wing Aircraft that can operate in any environment and will provide organic general support for territorial defense, internal peace and security plan, internal security operations, disaster response and national development. The contract was awarded to Airbus Defense and Space for the C-295M at a cost of PHP5.29bn in February 2014 with the first units delivered in March 2015. A fourth C-295M for Command and Control/VVIP transportation was acquired and received on 11 November 2019 and an additional three C-295Ws was acquired in 2019, bringing the fleet to 7 platforms.
- The Department of National Defense acquired 2 brand-new Light Lift Fixed Wing Aircraft and its Integrated Logistics Support (ILS) for the Air Force with a budget of PHP 814 million. The plan is to acquire Light Lift Fixed Wing Aircraft that can operate in any environment and will provide organic general support for territorial defense, internal peace and security plan, internal security operations, disaster response and national development. The contract was awarded to PT Dirgantara in January 2014 for the NC-212i. Due to delays in certifying a replaced autopilot system, the two units were only received in June 2018.
- The Department of National Defense will also acquire 3 units of Full Motion Flight Simulators and its Integrated Logistics Support (ILS) package with an approved budget of PHP 246,430,000 million. This will allow pilots an almost full sensory experience that can aid in improving flight instruction, enhancing proficiency, minimizing risks associated with emergency procedures training, reducing accidents, filling up downtimes, and saving on aircraft operational and maintenance costs.
- The Department of National Defense will acquire 21 units of refurbished UH-1 helicopters through public bidding and will include PHP 60 million worth of Integrated Logistics Support (ILS) package. After the failure of the third bidding, the DND has proceeded with the negotiated bidding with the joint venture of Rice Aircraft and Eagle Copter and finally awarded them on December 28, 2013, for a bid price of P1.25 billion for 21 refurbished UH-1 helicopters. Those helicopters should arrive within six months after the awarding.
- The PAF also eyes for the JAS 39, the F-16C, the F-15E, the F/A-18 Hornet and the IAI Kfir Block 60 as one of the next generation fighters. In responding to the Philippine desire for multirole fighters, the United States offered variants of the General Dynamics F-16 Fighting Falcon, and Sweden offered the Saab JAS 39 Gripen. After a throughout study and research in 2018, the Department of National Defense prefers the Swedish-made Gripen multi-role supersonic jet fighter for the Philippine Air Force.
- In November 2013, the DND released an invitation to bid for the acquisition of 3 brand new Search and Rescue seaplanes with an Integrated Logistics package (ILS). The DND has allotted 2.67 billion pesos for this project. The pre-bid conference was scheduled at November 15, 2013, while the actual bidding was scheduled at November 29, 2013. The seaplanes being offered should be used by the Armed Forces of the country of origin or by the Armed Forces of at least 2 other countries.
- On Mar. 17, 2014, it was reported that there are plans to procure an additional eight combat utility helicopters. It was later reported that these helicopters are Bell 412s that will be acquired from Canada. Three of these helicopters will be configured as VIP transports while the remaining five will be used to replace aging Bell 412 helicopters acquired during the Ramos administration. The helicopters will be acquired from the Canadian Commercial Corp. through a government-to-government transaction. It was also reported that the contract will be signed on Mar. 28, 2014.
- On 2018, the DND announced that Philippines was interested in ordering 23 attack helicopters, such as the TAI/AgustaWestland T129 ATAK or other attack helicopters, like the Bell AH-1Z Viper, the Sikorsky S-70i, the Mil Mi-35, the Mil Mi-28, the HAL Rudra, and the Airbus H145M. On 18 December 2018, Philippines and Turkey signed a memorandum of understanding with the TAI for new 10 T129s for the PAF. However, due to the sanctions imposed by the US Government on Turkey, and the failure of the delivery of its engines from the UK and the US, the PAF decided to look for alternatives instead, with the Bell AH-1Z Viper, the Boeing AH-64 Apache, and the PZL Mielec S70i Attack Helicopter being offered by the US for the project. Finally, the PAF ultimately decided to push with the T-129 ATAK helicopter, with guarantees requested from TAI/AgustaWestland.
- In August 2020, Philippine Air Force received full delivery of three Hermes 900 and one Hermes 450 unmanned aerial systems (UAS) as part of a contract worth approximately $175 million. Each system consists of three unmanned aerial vehicles (UAVs), a ground control system and support equipment. Elbit Systems also included a spare used Hermes 450 UAV as part of the deal, for a total of 9 Hermes 900 UAVs and 4 Hermes 450 UAVs.
- In June 2021, an article reported that the Department of National Defense is submitting a proposal for the acquisition of Saab JAS-39 Gripen for the PAF's multi-role fighter acquisition program.
- The Philippine Air Force (PAF) is eyeing the South Korean-made KF-21 "Boramae", which is now undergoing development and flight testing, as one of the possible contenders for its multi-role fighter (MRF) project. PAF is closely monitoring the developments of the KF-21 whose prototype had its first flight last July 19, 2022.

=== Philippine Army ===
- The Philippine Army received 114 M113A2 armored personnel carriers from the ex-US Army stocks in 2016. These are part of an earlier request by the Philippine government which was approved by the DSCA in 2012. Another batch of 28 M113A2, which includes 14 units to be armed with 76 mm turrets taken from decommissioned FV101 Scorpion tanks and fitted with modern fire control and thermal imaging equipment, 10 M113A2 with a Remote Controlled Weapons system (6 with 12.7mm machine guns, 4 with 25mm autocannons), and 4 armored recovery vehicles. These modifications will be made by Israeli company Elbit Systems Land and C4I before delivery in 2015.
- The government would also acquire rocket launchers, hand-held radios and night fighting equipment for the Philippine Army.
  - In January 2014, the Philippine Army ordered 400 Airtronic RPG-7s from the United States to replace their obsolete M18 and M67 recoilless rifles. The Airtronic RPG-7 is 60 percent lighter than the recoilless rifles and deliveries are to be completed by the end of the year.
- The Bids and Awards Committee of the Department of National Defense has declared the United States-based Remington arms company the winning bidder to supply 50,629 pieces of Remington R4 rifles according to the Philippine representative of the company. The bid was for little less than P2-billion. "Remington submitted a total bid price of P1,944,261,591.66, saving government coffers P1,245,365,408.34, based on the total authorized budget of contract of P3,189,627,000". This would place the price for each rifle at around P38,400, or around $960. On 18 March 2014, the Philippine Army confirmed the purchase of 63,000 new-built M4 carbines for P2.4 billion, with the rifles costing P38,402 each. The M4s are part of an effort to replace the Army's Vietnam-era automatic rifles.
- The Armed Forces of the Philippines will acquire close to P40m ($1m) worth of hand grenades to be used for security operations. A bid bulletin published in The STAR showed that the AFP will acquire 11,364 smoke grenades and 11,460 fragmentation grenades. The government has allotted P19.944m for the smoke grenades and P19.998m for the fragmentation grenades.
- The government is ordering 44,080 force protection equipment sets, composed of bulletproof vest, plate inserts and soft-ballistic panel, for which the government allotted some P1.76 billion. Each FPE weighs from 5.8 kilograms to 6.8 kg. The BAC expects the winning bidder to deliver 15,000 sets within 120 days of the opening of Letter of Credit. The remaining 29,080 sets will be delivered later.
- The Philippine government was planning to buy anti-aircraft guided missiles from Israel. The surface-to-air missiles or multiple launch rocket systems were being offered by Rafael Advanced Defense Systems Ltd. and Israel Military Industries Ltd., both based in Israel. Defense Secretary Voltaire Gazmin was planning to go to Israel next week to forge an agreement with the prospective suppliers. "If you have an agreement this would hasten the procurement process, say in three to six months you would already have the weapons. The agreement gives you the leeway to access all the information you want know about a particular weapon you want to procure."
- The Philippine Army was planning to purchase a number of 155 mm self-propelled artillery to bolster the country's territorial defense capability. The Department of National Defense opened the bidding for 12 units of 155 mm howitzers and 240 rounds of projectiles worth of P438.6 million. The acquisition will boost the existing howitzers in its inventory but were outdated. On 1 April 2014, Israeli company Elbit Systems won the bid and will deliver 12 Soltam ATHOS towed artillery pieces.
- The Philippine Army has allotted 1.5 million pesos for its development of its 3rd Unmanned Aerial Vehicle (UAV). The UAV will be an enhanced version of the Philippine Army's first two drones, the "Raptor" and the "Knight Falcon".
- It was reported that the Philippine Army is planning to acquire P530 million worth of disaster response equipment that includes 6 units of road rollers, 30 units of dump trucks, 14 units of excavators, 8 units of road graders, and 12 units of dozers.
- It was reported that the DND plans to acquire a shore-based missile system with a budget of PHP 6.5 billion that will be placed under the control and supervision of the Army. On 31 March 2014, it was reported that the SSM System will consist of 12 launchers with its attendant trailers and tracking systems plus the missiles themselves. These shore-to-ship missiles could be fired to hit naval or other sea-based targets.
- On 31 March 2014, a defense official stated that the Government is considering the acquisition of the Raytheon MIM-23 HAWK (Homing All the Way Killer) surface-to-air missiles (SAM). Made by US defense firm Raytheon Corporation, the HAWK is a medium-range SAM that has a range of about 40 kilometers and can reach targets flying as high as 40,000 feet. It is intended that the Hawk-5, the variant being eyed for purchase, will complement and protect the shore-to-ship launchers the government also intends to acquire.
- The Department of National Defense (DND) is looking at the possibility of acquiring some medium tanks with a total of 15 units for its armored division. This was emphasized by Defense Secretary Delfin Lorenzana when asked by the PNA Wednesday on whether the ongoing conflict in densely-packed Marawi City, where Maute Group terrorists converted concrete houses and buildings into fortified fighting positions, necessitates the acquisition of a main battle tank fleet. In October 2020, The DND awarded the contract to Elbit Systems of Israel to produce Sabrah medium battle tanks and tank destroyers, which platforms are based on ASCOD IFVs and Pandur II wheeled APCs.

=== Philippine Navy and Marine Corps ===
- The Philippines acquired two brand-new frigates as part of the modernization program of the Armed Forces of the Philippines. In early October 2015, DND announced the invitation to bid for the 2 brand-new frigates with an approved budget of Php18B. The package includes complete weapons system and must be delivered within 1,460 calendar days from the opening of the letter of credit. Pre-bidding is scheduled on October 11 and the first stage of bidding will be on October 25. On 24 October 2016, the contract to supply two brand new general purpose stealth frigates was signed between the Department of National Defense, represented by Defense Sec. Delfin Lorenzana, and Hyundai Heavy Industries, represented by its Senior Vice President Mr. Ki Sun Chung, under the presence of officials from the DND, AFP, PN, HHI, and the South Korean Ambassador to the Philippines. The first of class, BRP Jose Rizal (FF-150) was commissioned in July 2020, while the second frigate, BRP Antonio Luna (FF-151) was commissioned in March 2021.
- The BRP Alcaraz (FF-16) is the Philippine Navy's second Hamilton-class cutter and sister ship of the BRP Gregorio del Pilar (PF-15). The BRP Alcaraz has 14 officers and 74 crew members led by Capt. Ernesto Baldovino. It is capable of conducting patrols for long periods of time and can withstand heavy weather and rough sea conditions. BRP Alcaraz was named after Commodore Ramon Alcaraz, a Philippine Navy officer, who commanded a patrol boat that shot down three Japanese aircraft.
- BRP Andrés Bonifacio (FF-17) is the third Gregorio del Pilar-class frigate In commission. She is the second ship of the Philippine Navy to be named after Andrés Bonifacio, a Filipino revolutionary leader, regarded as the "Father of the Philippine Revolution" and one of the most influential national heroes of the Philippines.
- It was also reported that the Philippine Navy is planning further upgrades for its Gregorio del Pilar-class frigates. The upgrades will feature upgrades for navigation, propulsion, communication, surveillance, and weapons systems.
- Four groups took part in a conference for the bidding of 2 Strategic Sealift Vessels with Integrated Logistics Support (ILS), a PHP4-billion ($93 million) project of the Philippine Navy. The pre-bidding held at the Department of National Defense saw groups such as Navantia of Spain, Daewoo of South Korea, Larsen and Toubro of India, and Austal of Australia each appearing keen to win the supply contracts. It is among the 24 big-ticket items that President Benigno Aquino III wants to accomplish under the five-year military modernization program. The winning bidder is required to deliver the first SSV within 730 calendar days from the opening of the Letter of Credit and the second SSV to be delivered a year later. The delivery of the first SSV is expected to take place in 2015 and the second in 2016 before the term of President Aquino ends. SSVs are multi-role vessels for search and rescue operations that can also be fitted with hospital facilities and a helipad, but the ship's primary role is to transport a battalion of soldiers with armored vehicles.
- The Supply and Delivery of CWS Requirements for the Enhancement of Maritime Domain Awareness (MDA) Capability and Security of DOE Service Contract Areas of the Philippine Navy was also publicly bid by the DND and AFP. The Raytheon Company won the design and construction of the National Coast Watch Center (NCWC); support integration of data from various agencies into the NCWC; and provide acquisition, installation and training on an automatic identification system as well as radio communications for the Government of the Philippines. The contract was awarded July 2013, and will end July 31, 2015.
- The Philippine Navy looked forward to the delivery of 3 AgustaWestland AW109 Power naval helicopters. The contract includes initial logistics support and training for aircrew and maintenance personnel. The AW109 Power's multi-role abilities and high performance will provide the Philippine Navy with an enhanced maritime operational capability. The 3 helicopters arrived on Dec. 8,2013. 2 more AgustaWestland AW109 Power naval helicopters are scheduled to arrive in the first quarter of 2014.
- The Philippine Marine Corps has a joint purchase with the Philippine Army is for around 44,080 new body armor or force protection equipment, additional 50,000 new rifles based on M16/M4/M4A1/AR-15 platform and 5,500 close combat optics is underway, to replace the older M16A1 still in service on both armed forces branches. composed of basic vest, plate inserts and soft-ballistic panel and weighing between 5.8 kilograms to 6.8 kg.
- In 2011, the Philippine Navy ordered 6 US-made riverine patrol boats. These boats arrived on August 15, 2013.
- The Philippine Navy announced that it will acquire an anti-submarine helicopter to boost up its naval air group. This is aside from the helicopters ordered from AgustaWestland that will be arriving in 2014. "This is under the Medium Term Capability Development Program (MTCDP 2013–2017)". The anti-submarine helicopter is part of the PN's efforts to build its anti-submarine warfare capability. The bidding for 2 anti-submarine helicopters worth Php5.4 billion will start on April 24, 2014.
- The Philippine Navy eyes for the submarine, Reports as of May 2011 indicate that the Philippine Navy is eyeing the purchase of its first submarine not later than 2020, although no further details were provided. The “Philippine Fleet Desired Force Mix” strategy concept publicly released in May 2012 indicates the requirement of at least 3 submarines for deterrence and undersea warfare to be available by 2020.
- On the DND invited bidders for Amphibious Assault Vehicles Acquisition Project of 8 brand-new units of amphibious assault vehicles (AAV) with Integrated Logistics Support (ILS) for the Philippine Navy amounted to Php2.5B. Delivery is required for 850 days from the opening of the letter of credit. This acquisition is part of the PN's MRV/SSV or "Mother Ship" Project which will serve as platform for insertion of troops in beaches in an event of military siege. Also, they are interested to purchase a Russian BMP-3F.
- On February 4, 2014, a Philippine Navy official told that the Navy is going to modernize its current fleet of MPACs, which includes installation of more advanced radar and sensor equipment and possibly of more longer range weaponry such as anti-ship missiles. The DND already opened a public bidding for the companies who will provide remote-weapon systems and missile launchers for the MPACs.
- On February 7, 2014, the Philippine Navy announced its acquisition of three medium-sized refueling tankers that will boost the Navy's "RAS" or "replenishment at sea" capability. The ships will come from the Philippine National Oil Corporation (PNOC) and will arrive by May, during the Navy's 116th founding anniversary celebration.
- On August 22, 2018, The Spike-ER missiles system, which arrived in the country last April, the Navy's first missile weapon capable of penetrating 1,000 mm (39 inches) of rolled homogeneous armor and having a range of eight kilometers, was formally put in service.
- In December 2019, Secretary of National Defense Delfin Lorenzana announced that the Scorpène-class submarine of France fits the requirements of the Philippine Navy.
- The Department of National Defense signed a contract agreement with Hyundai Heavy Industries for the acquisition of two (2) brand new corvettes worth PHP 28 Billion for the Philippine Navy in a virtual signing ceremony held on December 28, 2021.

On April 27, Israel Aerospace Industries announced that they signed an agreement with HHI to supply the future corvettes with the IAI ALPHA 3D radar system.

- Philippines select Hyundai Heavy Industries to build 6 new offshore patrol vessels.The contract to build these vessels was signed on June 27, 2022.
- Philippine Navy representatives examined the decommissioned Pohang-class corvette ROKS Andong (PCC-771) at the Jinhae naval base in South Korea. It was found to be in “good operating condition.
- All 9 Shaldag Mk V patrol boats will be armed with one 30mm Typhoon RCWS and two 12.7mm Mini Typhoon RCWS. Only 4 of the 9 patrol boats ordered will be delivered with a Spike-NLOS Typhoon missile launcher, the rest are FFBNW. Two out of the nine are expected to be shipped in September 2022.
- With a project worth of ₱5 billion, the Philippine Navy released a requirement for two more landing docks which are believed to be improvements over the Tarlac-class. On 5 June 2022, a notice of award was issued to PT PAL for the project. On 24 June 2022, a contract was signed between PT PAL and the Department of National Defense.
- The Harbor and Oceangoing Tugboat Acquisition Project of the Philippine Navy is intended to improve port mobility and support PN fleet activities, and replace the aging tugboats in service. The project involves the acquisition of one harbor tugboat and one ocean-going tugboat. The project was awarded to Josefa Slipways for two tugboats based on the RAmparts 2700 and RAmparts 3000W designs, respectively. A keel-laying ceremony for the first batch of tugboats was held on 10 June 2022 at Josefa Slipways' facility at Sual, Pangasinan.
- In 2023, the Philippine Navy reported significant progress in its modernization program, highlighting the acquisition of new vessels and equipment aimed at enhancing maritime security and defense capabilities.
- The BRP Miguel Malvar (FFG-06), the lead ship of the Miguel Malvar-class frigates, was launched on June 18, 2024, at Hyundai Heavy Industries' shipyard in Ulsan, South Korea. The vessel was delivered to the Philippine Navy on April 8, 2025, and is expected to be commissioned later in the year.
- The second ship of the class, BRP Diego Silang (FFG-07), was launched on March 27, 2025, and is scheduled for delivery to the Philippine Navy by the end of 2025 or early 2026.
- In 2024, the Philippine Navy received additional Fast Attack Interdiction Craft (FAIC) platforms from Israel Shipyards Limited, enhancing its littoral combat capabilities. The FAICs, also known as the Acero-class patrol vessels, are equipped with advanced weaponry and are part of the Navy's efforts to modernize its fleet.
- The Philippine Marine Corps continued its modernization efforts by activating new units and acquiring advanced equipment to enhance its amphibious and littoral warfare capabilities. This includes the establishment of the Maritime Security Battalion and the retraining of existing battalions into Marine Amphibious Ready Units.
- In April 2025, during the Balikatan joint military exercises, the United States deployed the Navy-Marine Expeditionary Ship Interdiction System (NMESIS) to the Philippines. This coastal, vehicle-mounted missile system was used in simulations aimed at countering maritime threats and is expected to remain in the country post-exercise, improving the Philippines' coastal defense capabilities.
- The Philippine Navy is set to receive two brand-new missile corvettes from South Korea starting in 2025, as part of its efforts to enhance maritime defense capabilities. These corvettes are expected to backstop the existing Jose Rizal-class frigates in service.
- In 2024, the Philippine government allocated a record-high PHP50 billion budget for the Armed Forces of the Philippines' modernization program in 2025, aimed at building up national defense capabilities amid continued tensions in the West Philippine Sea.
- The Philippine Navy's future fleet expansion includes the acquisition of six offshore patrol vessels (OPVs) from South Korea's Hyundai Heavy Industries, with deliveries expected between 2026 and 2028. These vessels are designed to enhance the Navy's maritime patrol and surveillance capabilities.
- In 2024, the Philippine Marine Corps activated its first Maritime Security Battalion, converted from Marine Battalion Landing Team 4 (MBLT-4), to secure maritime routes and enhance littoral operations. This unit is part of the Corps' shift from internal security to external defense, focusing on the protection of the country's maritime interests.

== Acquisition lists ==
=== Army ===
Procurements under RAFPMP (2013-ongoing)
Armored Vehicle	Engineering Vehicle	Artillery	Aircraft	Watercraft
28 GDELS ASCOD 2 Sabrah light tank; 28 Iveco Guarani armored personnel carrier; 15 FMC M125A2 armored mortar carrier; 1 GDELS ASCOD 2 armored command vehicle	1 GDELS ASCOD 2 armored recovery vehicle; 6 FNSS Kunduz armored earthmover; 6 Cukurova 4x4x4 armored backhoe loader; 4 Armtrac 100-350 Mk.2 VMMD demining vehicle; 2 Mantak Merkava 4 Tagash joint assault bridge; 2 WFEL dry support bridge	12 Soltam ATMOS 2000 self-propelled howitzer	4 Elbit Hermes 450 unmanned aerial vehicle; 21 Elbit Skylark 3 unmanned aerial vehicle; 129 Elbit Skylark I-LEX unmanned aerial vehicle; 1066 Elbit Thor unmanned aerial vehicle	7 16-meter light support boat; 24 Willard Marine 10-meter assault boat; 24 Willard Marine 9-meter scout boat

=== Air Force ===
Procurements under RAFPMP (2013-ongoing)
Combat Aircraft	Combat Support Aircraft	Transport Aircraft	Helicopter	Unmanned Aerial Vehicle	Air Defense
24 T-50 Golden Eagle; 6 Embraer A-29B Super Tucano light attack aircraft	2 ATR-72-600MP maritime patrol aircraft	3 Lockheed Martin C-130J-30 Super Hercules tactical transport aircraft; 2 Lockheed C-130T Hercules tactical transport aircraft; 2 Lockheed C-130H Hercules tactical transport aircraft; 3 Airbus C-295W tactical transport aircraft; 1 Airbus C-295M VIP transport aircraft; 1 Gulfstream G280 VIP transport aircraft; 6 IAe NC-212i Aviocar light transport aircraft	6 TAI T129B ATAK attack helicopter; 48 Sikorsky S-70i Black Hawk utility helicopter; 8 Subaru-Bell 412EPX utility helicopter; 8 Bell 412EP utility helicopter	9 Elbit Hermes 900 unmanned aerial vehicle; 3 Elbit Hermes 450 unmanned aerial vehicle	3 batteries Rafael SPYDER-MR surface-to-air missile; 3 Mitsubishi Electric J/FPS-3ME air surveillance radar; 3 IAI Elta Systems ELM-2288ER AD-STAR air surveillance radar; 1 Mitsubishi Electric J/TPS-P14ME air surveillance radar

=== Navy ===
Procurements under RAFPMP (2013-ongoing)
Surface Combatant	Amphibious Warfare Vessel	Auxiliary Ship	Aircraft
2 Jose Rizal-class frigate; 4 Miguel Malvar-class frigate; 6 Rajah Sulayman-class offshore patrol vessel; 9 Nestor Acero-class fast attack craft; 6 Multipurpose Assault Craft Mk 3 fast attack craft	2 Tarlac-class landing platform dock	1 RAmparts 3000W oceangoing tugboat; 1 RAmparts 2700 harbor tugboat	8 AgustaWestland AW159 Mk.220 Wildcat anti-submarine warfare helicopter

=== Marine ===
Procurements under RAFPMP (2013-ongoing)
Armored Vehicle	Artillery	Aircraft
8 Hanwha Defense KAAV7A1 armored personnel carrier	8 EXPAL 120-MX2-SM 120mm towed mortar; 30 EXPAL 81-MX2-KM 81mm mortar; 240 Rheinmetall EXPAL RSG60 60mm mortar; 3 batteries BrahMos supersonic cruise missile	24 MAG Aerospace Super Swiper II unmanned aerial vehicle

== Budget ==
Type	2015	2016	2017	2018	2019	2020	2021	2022	2023	2024	2025	2026
Programmed	₱ 20B	₱ 25B	₱ 25B	₱ 25B	₱ 25B	₱ 25B	₱ 27B	₱ 29B	₱ 27.5B	₱ 40B	₱ 35B	₱40B
Unprogrammed	₱ 10B	₱ 10B	₱ 5B	₱ 5B	N/A	₱ 5B	₱ 11B	₱ 10B	₱ 17.5B	₱ 10B	N/A	₱50B
Total	₱ 30B	₱ 35B	₱ 30B	₱ 30B	₱ 35B	₱ 30B	₱ 38B	₱ 39B	₱ 45B	₱ 50B	₱ 35B	₱90B

== See also ==
- Armed Forces of the Philippines
- Department of National Defense
- Government Arsenal
