= BRP Diego Silang =

BRP Diego Silang is the name of the following ships of the Philippine Navy, named for Diego Silang:

- BRP Diego Silang (PF-9) (later PF-14), ex-USS Bering Strait, a Andrés Bonifacio-class frigate acquired in 1976 and in commission until 1990
- BRP Diego Silang (FFG-7), a Miguel Malvar-class frigate commissioned in 2025
