= BRP Miguel Malvar (FFG-6) =

Philippine Navy guided missile frigate

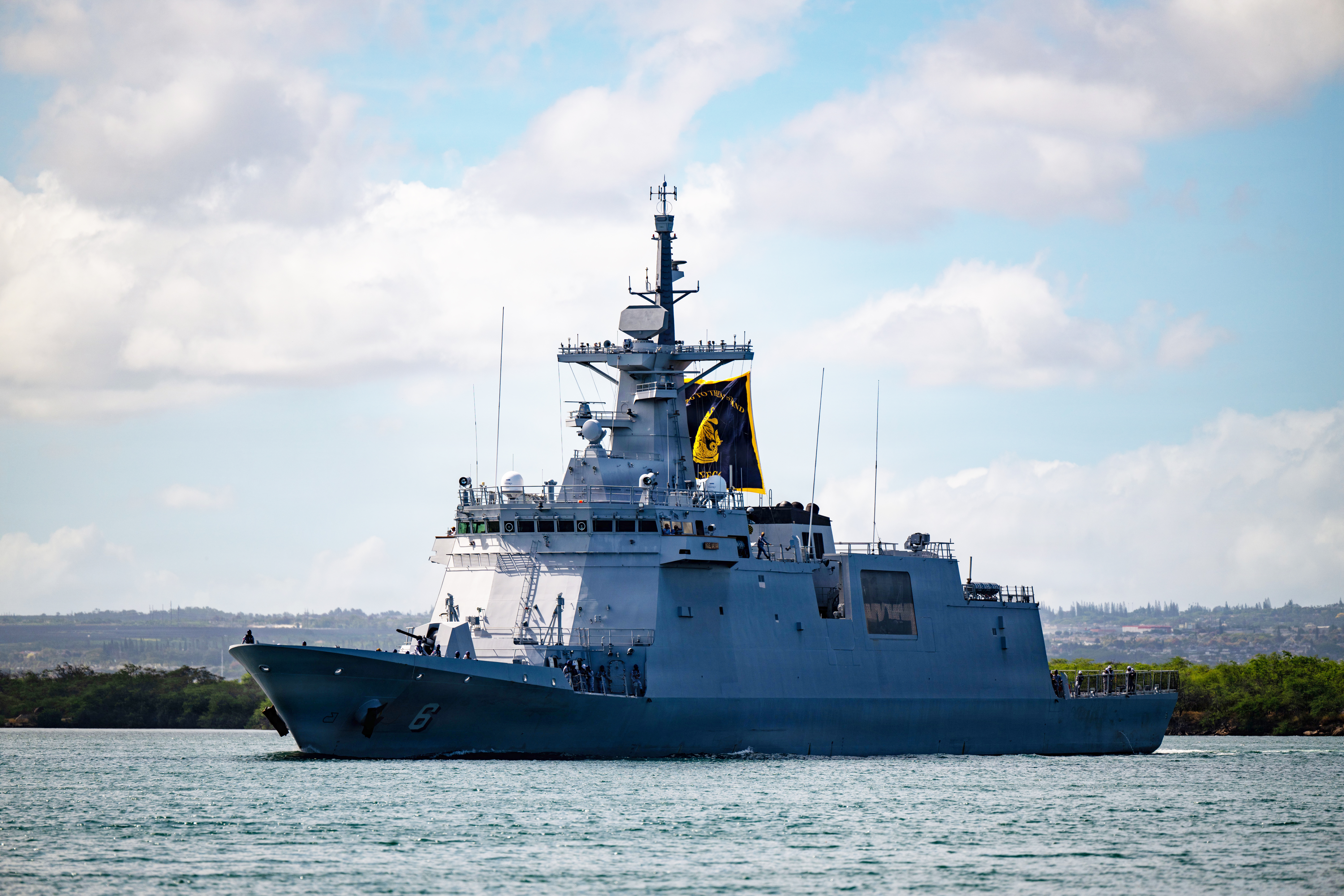
- BRP Miguel Malvar (FFG-6) departs from Joint Base Pearl Harbor-Hickam to participate in the sea phase of RIMPAC 2026

Philippines
- Name: BRP Miguel Malvar
- Namesake: Miguel Malvar y Carpio
- Ordered: 28 December 2021
- Builder: Hyundai Heavy Industries
- Cost: PH₱12.5 billion (~US$250M)
- Laid down: 22 November 2023
- Launched: 18 June 2024
- Commissioned: 20 May 2025
- Identification: FFG-6
- Status: Active
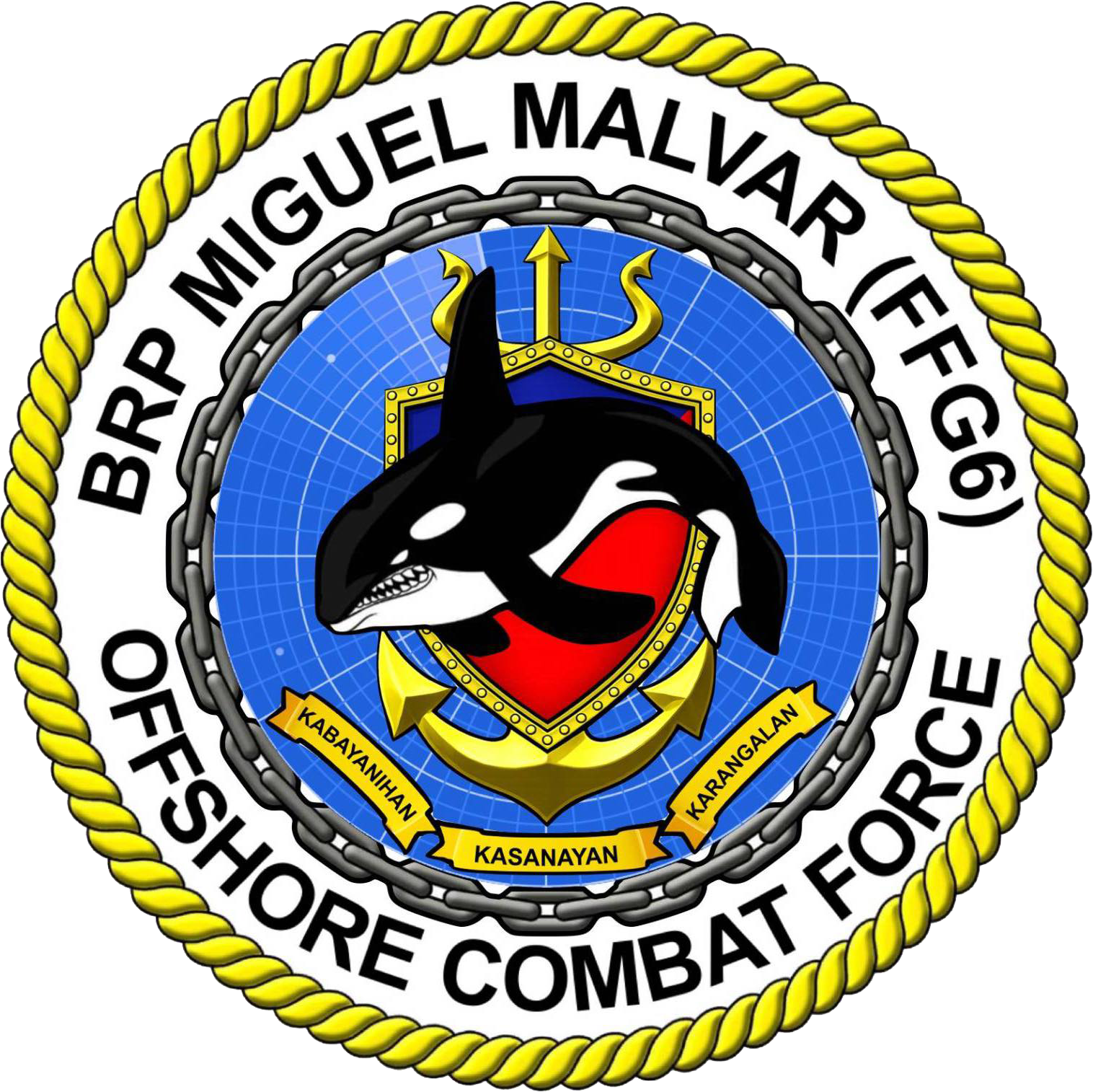
- Badge

General characteristics
- Class & type: Miguel Malvar-class frigate
- Displacement: 3,200 tonnes
- Length: 118.4 m (388 ft 5 in)
- Beam: 14.9 m (48 ft 11 in)
- Draft: 3.7 m (12 ft 2 in)
- Depth: 7.2 m (23 ft 7 in)
- Installed power: 4 × MTU-STX diesel generators
- Propulsion: Combined diesel and diesel (CODAD) arrangement: 4 × MTU-STX diesel engines
- Speed: 25 knots (46 km/h; 29 mph)
- Range: 4,500 nmi (8,300 km; 5,200 mi) at 15 knots (28 km/h; 17 mph)
- Endurance: 20 days
- Boats & landing craft carried: 2 × RHIB
- Complement: 120
- Sensors & processing systems: Combat system: Hanwha Systems Naval Shield Baseline 4 Integrated Combat Management System; Search radar: EL/M-2258 ALPHA S-band 3D AESA multifunction radar; Navigation radar: Kelvin Hughes SharpEye I-band & E/F-band radars; Fire control radar: Selex ES NA-25X fire control radar; Electro-Optical Tracking System: Safran PASEO XLR electro-optical; Tactical Data Link: Hanwha Systems Link P (Link K Derivative); Sonar: Harris Corp Model 997 medium-to-low frequency active/passive hull-mounted sonar
- Electronic warfare & decoys: RESM: Elbit Systems Elisra Aquamarine R-ESM and C-ESM suite; Countermeasures: 2 × Terma C-Guard DL-12T decoy launchers
- Armament: Missiles; 8 × C-Star SSM-710K antiship cruise missiles in quad configuration; 16-cell Vertical Launching System for 16 x MBDA VL MICA ship-to-air missiles; Torpedoes; 2 × SEA triple-tube 324mm torpedo launching systems for K745 Blue Shark torpedoes; Guns; 1 × OTO-Melara 76/62SR dual-purpose rapid-fire autocannon; 1 × Aselsan GOKDENIZ 100/35 CIWS; 4 × K6 (12.7mm) 50cal heavy machine gun
- Aircraft carried: 1 × medium AW-159 wildcat ASW naval helicopter
- Aviation facilities: flight deck for a 12t helicopter; enclosed hangar (starboard side) for 10t helicopter

BRP Miguel Malvar (FFG-6) is the lead ship of her class of guided missile frigates of the Philippine Navy. She is the second ship to be named after Miguel Malvar y Carpio, a Filipino general during the Philippine Revolution against Spain, and the Philippine-American War.

The ship underwent fit-out works at HD Hyundai's shipyard in Ulsan, South Korea, and was delivered to the Philippine Navy on April 8, 2025. The ship was commissioned with the Philippine Navy's Offshore Combat Force on May 20, 2025.

== Construction and design ==
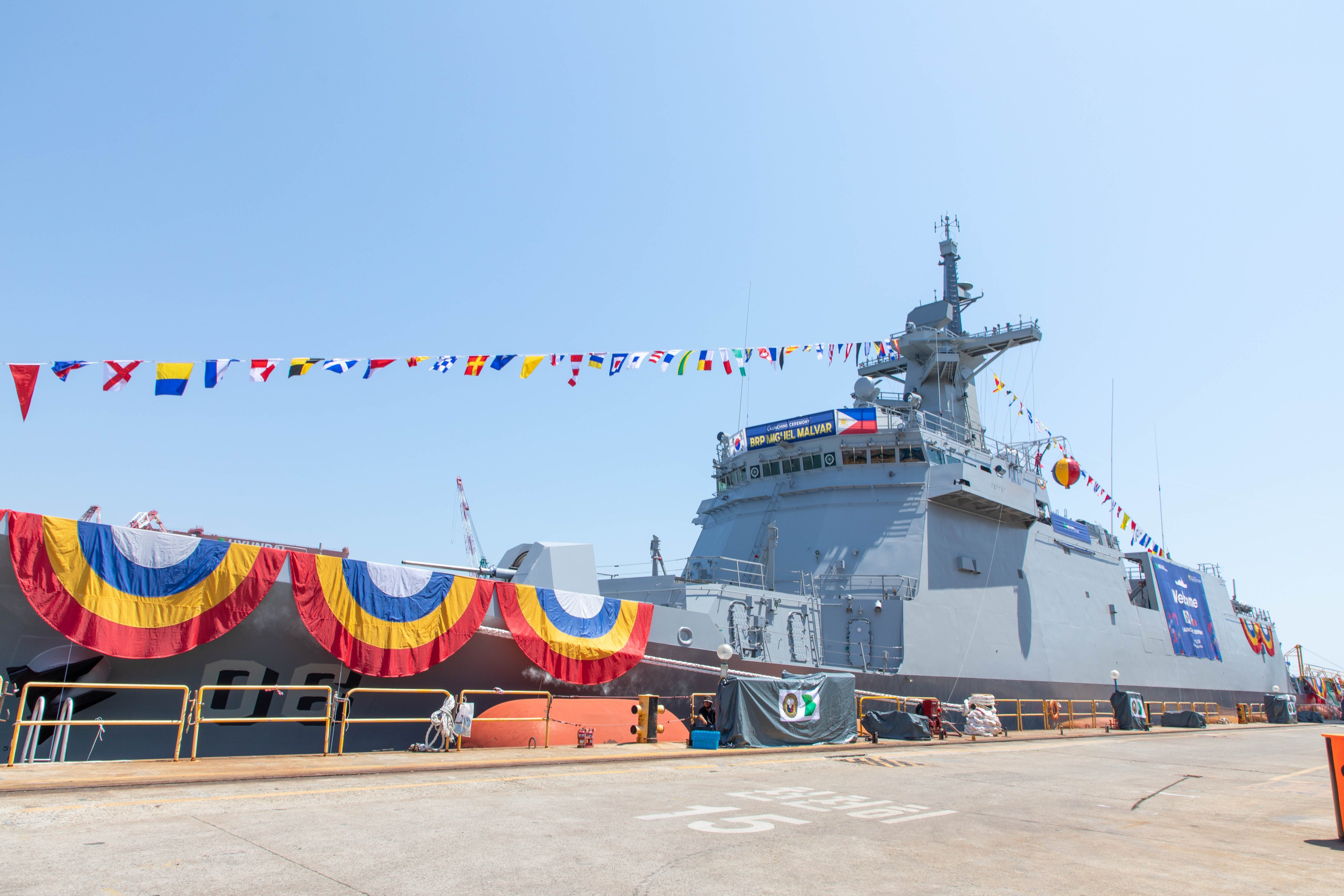
BRP Miguel Malvar was launched by HD Hyundai Heavy Industries in Ulsan, South Korea

BRP Miguel Malvar was designed and built by HD Hyundai Heavy Industries (HD HHI) of South Korea, and is based on the shipbuilder's HDC/HDF-3200 design, which in turn was a re-designed and enlarged HDF-2600 design used for the Jose Rizal-class frigate already in service with the Philippine Navy. The design was heavily influenced by the base design of the Incheon-class frigate built for the Republic of Korea Navy, but with heavy design developments and features found on newer frigates of the R.O.K. Navy, considering reduced radar cross-section by having cleaner lines, smooth surface design, reduced overhangs and a low free-board.

The ship held its First Steel Cutting Ceremony on 11 May 2023 at HD HHI's facility in Ulsan, South Korea. Its Keel Laying Ceremony was held on 22 November 2023, coinciding with the First Steel Cutting Ceremony of its sister ship, the future BRP Diego Silang (FFG-07).

The ship was launched on 18 June 2024, in a ceremony led by Defense Secretary Gilberto Teodoro, and attended by his wife and the Philippines' special envoy to the UNICEF Monica Prieto-Teodoro, Armed Forces of the Philippines Chief Gen. Romeo Brawner, Philippine Navy Chief Vice Adm. Toribio Adaci Jr and other military officials.

Miguel Malvar was delivered to the Philippine Navy on April 8, 2025, with Secretary Teodoro leading the arrival ceremony at the Naval Operating Base in Subic, Zambales.

During the Philippine Navy's 127th founding anniversary, BRP Miguel Malvar was officially commissioned into active duty, along with the Acero-class Fast Attack Interdiction Craft BRP Albert Majini (PG-909).

== Service history ==
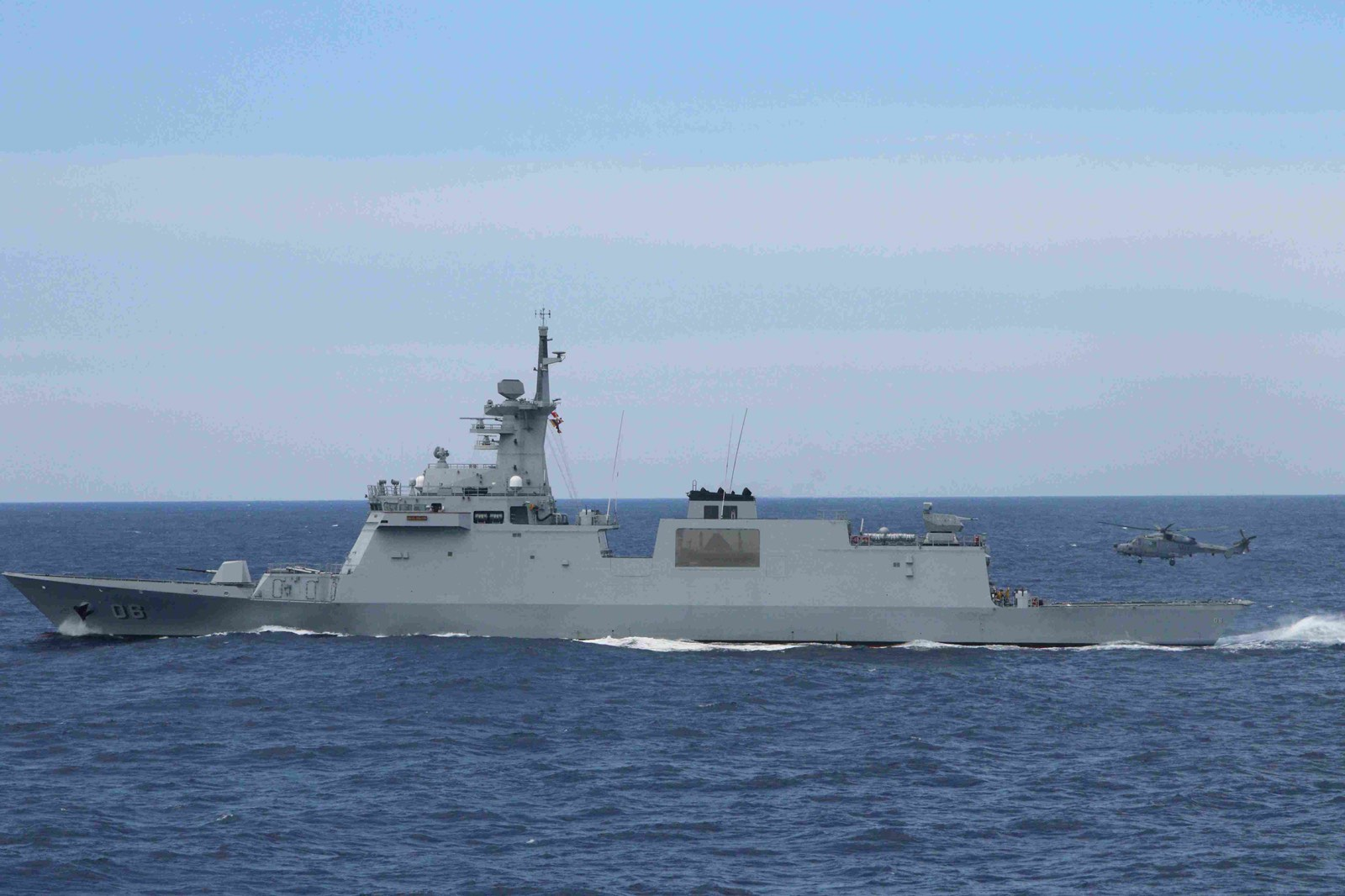
BRP Miguel Malvar sailing with an AW-159 Wildcat helicopter about to land on its helicopter deck.

On its first mission as an active frigate in service, BRP Miguel Malvar took part on its first mission through the Maritime Cooperative Activity between the Philippines and the United States, as it participated on the activity together with its counterparts from both the United States Navy and Marine Corps, with the event took place on 4 June 2025.

For its second mission, it participated on the 2nd Philippine-Japanese Maritime Cooperative Activity took place on 15 June 2025. The frigate comes accompanied with the Philippine Navy's AW-159 Wildcat anti-submarine helicopter that both countries used for the anti-submarine exercise that took place during the activity.

BRP Miguel Malvar sailed together with the destroyer JS Takanami (DD-110) of the Japan Maritime Self-Defense Force during the 2nd Maritime Cooperative Activity between the Philippines and Japan.

BRP Miguel Malvar participated at the International Fleet Review 2026 held at Visakapatanam in India in February 2026. It was the first joint exercise between India and the Philippines. She arrived at Visakapatnam of February 15th 2026. During the exercises she conducted mock ASW drills, becoming the only foreign ship to detect an Indian Submarine that was submerged in the Bay of Bengal.

== See also ==
- BRP Diego Silang (FFG-07)
- BRP Jose Rizal (FF-150)
- BRP Antonio Luna (FF-151)
