= Miguel Malvar =

Filipino general (1865–1911)

His Excellency General Miguel Malvar
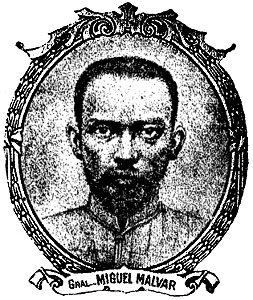

President of the Philippines
- Unofficial
- In office April 19, 1901 – April 16, 1902
- Preceded by: Emilio Aguinaldo
- Succeeded by: Macario Sakay (as President of the Tagalog Republic)

Personal details
- Born: Miguel Malvar y Carpio; September 27, 1865 Santo Tomas, Batangas, Captaincy General of the Philippines, Spanish Empire
- Died: October 13, 1911 (aged 46) Manila, Insular Government of the Philippine Islands
- Spouse: Paula Maloles
- Children: 11
- Profession: Revolutionary

Military service
- Allegiance: First Philippine Republic
- Branch/service: Philippine Republican Army
- Years of service: 1896–1902
- Rank: Brigadier general
- Commands: Batangas Brigade (also known as the Malvar Brigade)
- Battles/wars: Philippine Revolution; Philippine–American War

Miguel Malvar y Carpio (September 27, 1865 – October 13, 1911) was a Filipino general who served during the Philippine Revolution and, subsequently, during the Philippine–American War. He assumed command of the Philippine revolutionary forces during the latter, following the capture of resistance leader Emilio Aguinaldo by the Americans in 1901. According to some, he could have been listed as one of the presidents of the Philippines. However, is not recognized as such by the Philippine government.

== Early life ==
Malvar was born on September 27, 1865, in San Miguel, a barrio in Santo Tomas, Batangas, to Máximo Malvar (locally known as Capitán Imoy) and Tiburcia Carpio (locally known as Capitana Tibo). Malvar's family was well known in town not only for their wealth but for their generosity and diligence as well.

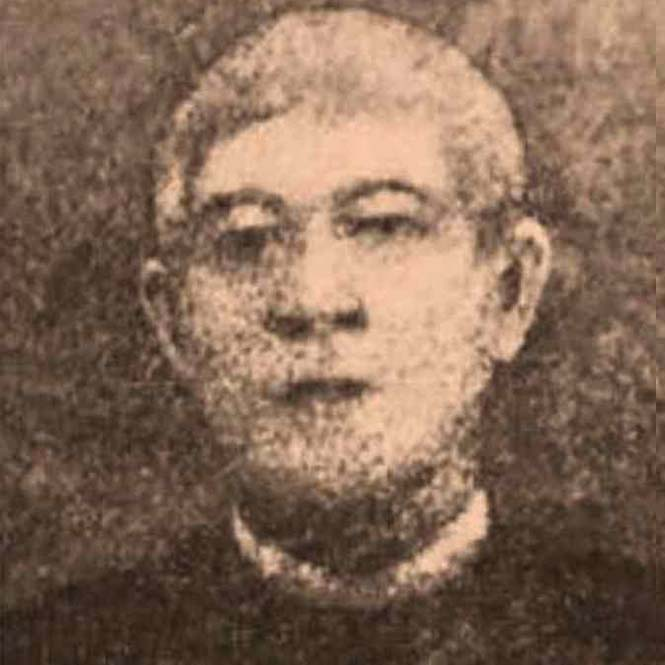
Valerio Malabanan established a school that helped poor Filipino children as well as prominent children of wealthy Batangueños have a quality academic experience that was secular in nature.

For his education, Malvar attended the town school in Santo Tomas. He later attended a private school run by Father Valerio Malabanan in Tanauan, Batangas, a well-regarded educational institution in Batangas at the time. Here, Malvar had fellow revolutionary Apolinario Mabini as his classmate. He then transferred to another school in Bauan, Batangas. He decided not to pursue higher education in Manila and preferred to settle down as a farmer instead. Instead, he helped his more studious younger brother, Potenciano, study medicine in Spain. Malvar was later elected as Capitán municipal of his hometown.

In 1891, Malvar married Paula Maloles, the daughter of the Capitán municipal of Santo Tomas, Don Ambrocio Maloles. Don Ambrocio was Malvar's successor as Capitán municipal. Ulay, as she was locally known, bore Malvar thirteen children, but only eleven of them survived: Bernabe, Aurelia, Marciano, Maximo, Crispina, Mariquita, Luz Constancia, Miguel (Junior), Pablo, Paula, and Isabel. Malvar had the habit of bringing his family with him as he went to battle during the Philippine Revolution and the Philippine–American War.

== Connections with Rizal ==
Malvar and his family had a friendship with José Rizal and his family. Rizal mended the harelip of Malvar's wife and Saturnina Rizal lent Malvar 1,000 pesos as an initial capital to start a business. Saturnina's husband, Manuel, was a relative of Malvar's, and Soledad Rizal Quintero's daughter, Amelia married Malvar's eldest son, Bernabe. Also, Paciano was Malvar's fellow revolutionary.

== Philippine Revolution ==
Malvar was an original Katipunero, having joined the Katipunan before the Philippine Revolution. When the Revolution began in August 1896, Malvar emerged from leading a 70-man army to becoming the military commander of Batangas. As a military commander, he coordinated offensives with General Emilio Aguinaldo, leader of the revolutionaries in Cavite, and General Paciano Rizal, leader of the revolutionaries in Laguna. On February 17, 1897, Malvar fought alongside General Edilberto Evangelista, Malvar's senior officer at the time, at the Battle of Zapote Bridge, where the senior died in battle. Succeeding Evangelista's generalship, Malvar had set up his own headquarters at Indang, Cavite, where he stayed until the Tejeros Convention. Malvar is considered by some to have succeeded to the presidency of the First Philippine Republic after Aguinaldo was captured by American forces.

After the Tejeros Convention, in which Aguinaldo won as president, Malvar opted to side with the Katipunan's Supremo, Andrés Bonifacio. In response to Malvar's support, Bonifacio gave them assistance in fighting their battles. Seeing the mutual relations between Malvar and Bonifacio, Aguinaldo decided to use his newly acquired position to put Batangas, as well as Malvar, under his jurisdiction. Malvar was also threatened with punishment if he did not break ties with Bonifacio, but this threat was never implemented. Bonifacio and his brother Procopio were found guilty, despite insufficient evidence, and they were recommended to be executed. Aguinaldo 'issued a commutation of the sentence' to deportation or exile on May 8, 1897, but Pío del Pilar and Mariano Noriel, both former supporters of Bonifacio, persuaded Aguinaldo to withdraw the order for the sake of preserving unity. In this they were seconded by Mamerto Natividád and other bona fide supporters of Aguinaldo. The Bonifacio brothers were murdered on May 10, 1897, in the mountains of Maragondon.

After Bonifacio was murdered, the Spanish offensive resumed, now under Governor-General Fernando Primo de Rivera, and forced Aguinaldo out of Cavite. Aguinaldo slipped through the Spanish cordon and, with 500 picked men, proceeded to Biak-na-Bató, a wilderness area at the tri-boundaries of the towns of San Miguel, San Ildefonso and Doña Remedios in Bulacan. When news of Aguinaldo's arrival there reached the towns of central Luzon, men from the Ilocos provinces, Nueva Ecija, Pangasinan, Tarlac, and Zambales, renewed their armed resistance against the Spanish.

On November 1, 1897, the provisional constitution for the Biak-na-Bato Republic was signed. By the end of 1897, Governor-General Primo de Rivera accepted the impossibility of quelling the revolution by force of arms. In a statement to the Cortes Generales, he said, "I can take Biak-na-Bato, any military man can take it, but I can not answer that I could crush the rebellion." Desiring to make peace with Aguinaldo, he sent emissaries to Aguinaldo seeking a peaceful settlement. Nothing was accomplished until Pedro A. Paterno, a distinguished lawyer from Manila perhaps wanting a Spanish nobility title, volunteered to act as negotiator. On August 9, 1897, Paterno proposed a peace based on reforms and amnesty to Aguinaldo. In succeeding months, practicing shuttle diplomacy, Paterno traveled back and forth between Manila and Biak-na-Bato carrying proposals and counterproposals. Paterno's efforts led to a peace agreement called the Pact of Biak-na-Bato. This consisted of three documents, the first two being signed on December 14, 1897, and the third being signed on December 15; effectively ending the Republic of Biak-na-Bato.

Malvar, along with other generals like Mariano Trías, Paciano Rizal, Manuel Tinio, and Artemio Ricarte, as opposed to the pact, believing it was a ruse of the Spanish to get rid of the Revolution easily, and therefore resumed military offensives. Aguinaldo, seeing the stiff resistance of Malvar and his sympathizers, issued a circular ordering the revolutionary generals to stop fighting. On January 6, 1898, Malvar ceased his offensives.

== Philippine–American War ==
On May 19, 1898, Aguinaldo, aboard the American revenue cutter McCulloch, returned to the Philippines with 13 of his military staff. After four days, the first delivery of arms from Hong Kong arrived. It amounted to 2,000 rifles and 200,000 rounds of ammunition. With Aguinaldo's return, the Filipinos, numbering around 12,000, who enlisted under the Spanish flag in the war against America defected to Aguinaldo's banner. By June, Philippine independence was declared in Kawit, Cavite and Manila found herself surrounded by Aguinaldo's troops. But on August 13, 1898, it was the Americans who captured Manila.

On February 4, 1899, hostilities began between Americans and Filipinos. On February 7, Malvar was appointed second-in-command of General Trías, who was the overall commander of the Filipino forces in southern Luzon. On February 23, General Antonio Luna needed Malvar and his unit to take part in a Filipino counterattack that was planned to regain ground lost earlier by Filipinos and capture Manila. However, the Filipino offensive collapsed mainly due to the insubordination of the Kawit Battalion. During the following months, Malvar harassed American troops south of Manila as he and his 3,000-man brigade conducted offensives in Muntinlupa. By July 1899, the Americans under General Robert Hall captured Calamba, Laguna. With ten companies (around 2,000 men) of American troops in the town, Malvar unsuccessfully besieged Calamba from August to December 1899.

On November 13, 1899, Aguinaldo disbanded the Filipino regular army, forming them into guerrilla units at Bayambang, Pangasinan and afterwards conducted his escape journey to Palanan, Isabela, which he reached by September 6, 1900. This change in tactics was not as successful as it had been against the Spaniards, and Aguinaldo was captured on March 23, 1901, by General Frederick Funston with help from some Macabebe scouts. General Trías, Aguinaldo's chosen successor as president and Commander-In-Chief of the Filipino forces, had already surrendered on March 15, 1901. Therefore, as designated in Aguinaldo's decreed line of succession, Malvar became President of the Philippine Republic. The Hong Kong Junta affirmed Malvar's authority in succeeding Aguinaldo. As he took over the affairs of the Republic, Malvar reorganized Filipino forces in southern Luzon and renamed the combined armed forces as "Army of Liberation". He also reorganized the regional departments of the Republic, which included the Marianas as a separate province.

Beginning January 1902, American General J. Franklin Bell took command of operations in Batangas and practiced scorched earth tactics that took a heavy toll on both guerrilla fighters and civilians alike. Malvar escaped American patrols by putting on disguises. So, as early as August 1901, the Americans released an exact description of Malvar's physical features. According to the description given, Malvar was of dark complexion and stood around 5 feet 3 inches (1.60 m). He weighed about 145 pounds (66 kg) and wore a 5 or 6 size of shoe. He surrendered to Bell on April 16, 1902 (Note: April 16, 1902, is the surrender date officially recognized by the Philippine Government. Some sources may give differing dates.) in Rosario, Batangas, mainly due to desertion of his top officers and to put an end to the sufferings of his countrymen.

== Later life and death ==
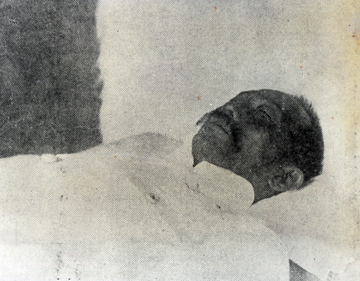
Malvar lying in state in 1911

After the war, he refused any position offered to him in the American colonial government. He died in Manila on October 13, 1911.

=== Descendants ===
Malvar had 11 children with Paula Chavez Malvar, including Bernabe, Aurelia, Marciano, Maximo, Crispina, Mariquita, Luz, Miguel Jr., Paula, Isabela and Pablo Malvar. His grandson, Jose Malvar Villegas Jr. was co-founder of KAANAK 1986, the official organization of descendants of Philippine national heroes.

Some of his great-great grandchildren continue to live in Batangas such as Michael Malvar and Miguel Malvar IV. Some of his descendants are connected to prominent Filipino families by blood, such as actress Theresa Malvar, who is also a descendant of the Rizal clan of Laguna. Some descendants are also connected to prominent Filipino families by marriage, such as director Gabriel Malvar, who married into the Hontiveros clan of Panay.

== Attributions as president ==
On September 18, 2007, Oriental Mindoro 1st district representative Rodolfo Valencia filed House Bill No. 2594, which declared Malvar as the second Philippine president, alleging that it is incorrect to consider Manuel L. Quezon as the second president of the Philippine Republic serving after Emilio Aguinaldo: "General Malvar took over the revolutionary government after General Emilio Aguinaldo, first president of the Republic, was captured on March 23, 1901, and [was] exiled in Hong Kong by the American colonial government—since he was next in command." In October 2011, Vice President Jejomar Binay sought the help of historians in proclaiming revolutionary General Miguel Malvar as the rightful second president of the Philippines.

== Commemoration ==
- The Philippine Navy had named ships after him; the previous patrol corvette BRP Miguel Malvar (PS-19), and the current guided missile frigate BRP Miguel Malvar (FFG-06).
- Extra Mile Productions conducted the General Miguel Malvar Essay Writing Contest in commemoration of the 100th Death Anniversary of General Miguel Malvar.
- Malvar, Batangas, a second class municipality in the Philippines, was named after him.
- Various streets were also named after him.
- In 2015, the National Historical Commission of the Philippines will open a museum in Santo Tomas to celebrate the 150th anniversary of Malvar's birthday on September 27.
- In 2015, the Bangko Sentral ng Pilipinas (BSP) released the 10-peso commemorative coin in honor of Malvar's 150th birth anniversary.
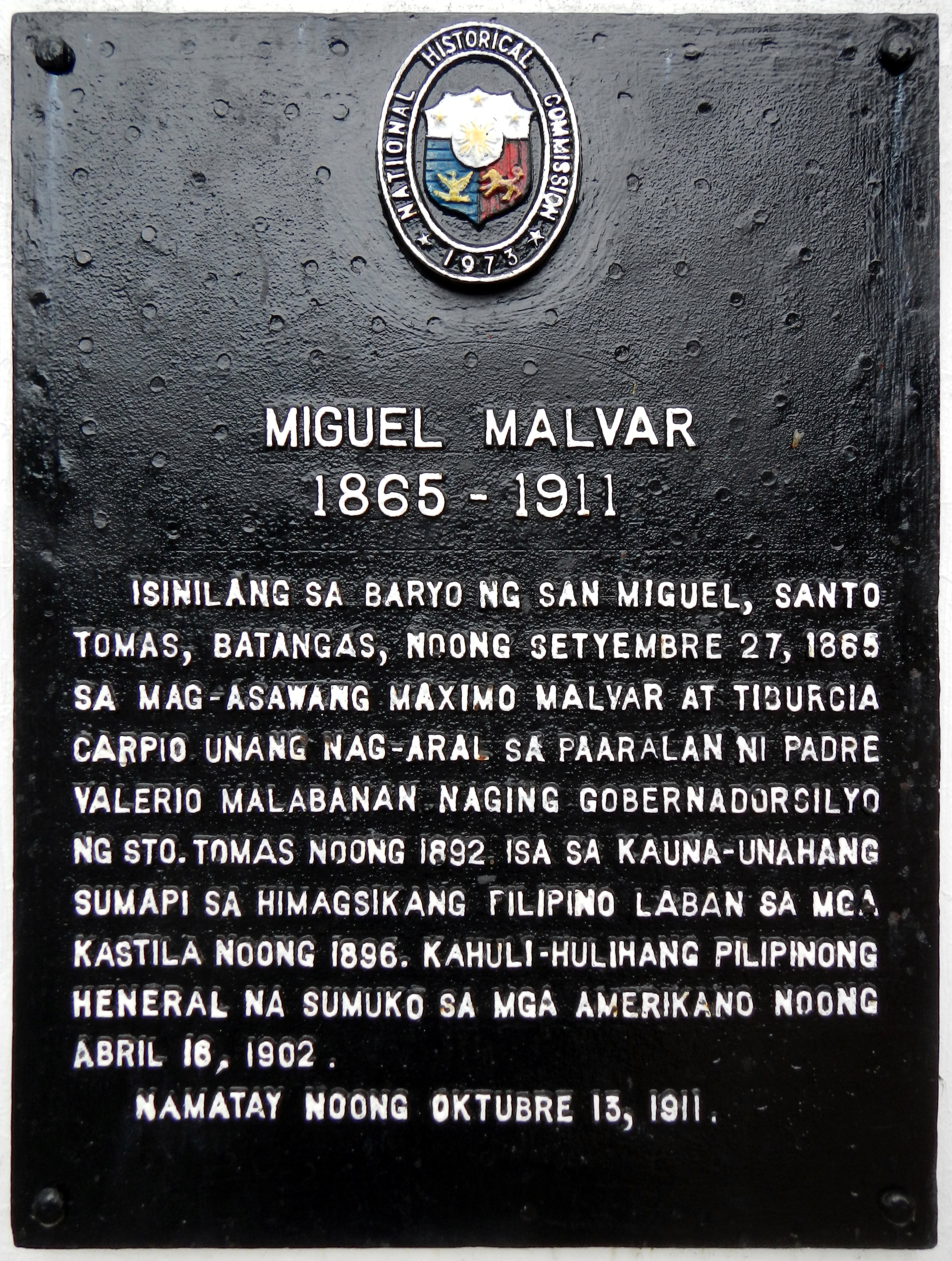
Historical marker installed in 1973 in Malvar, Batangas

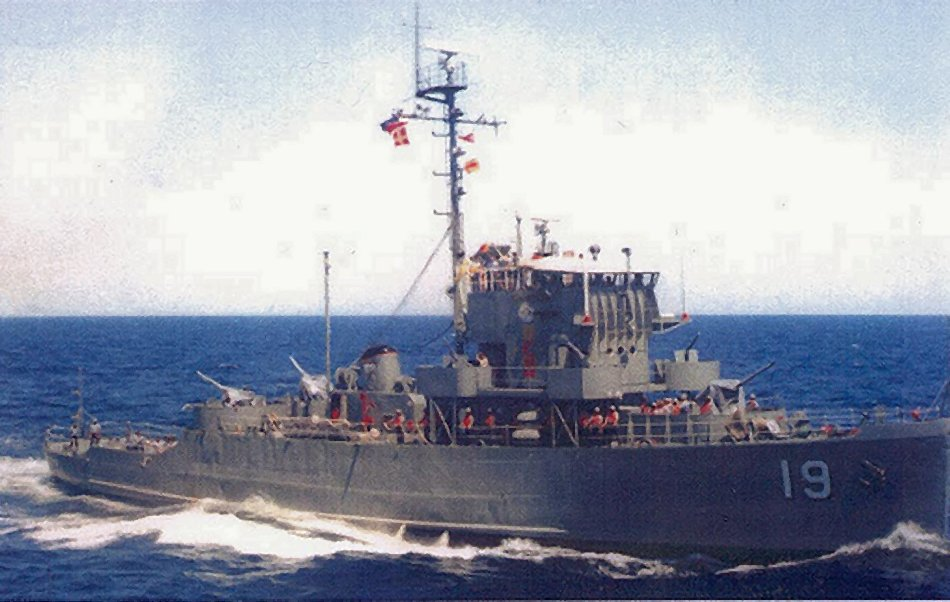
BRP Miguel Malvar (PS-19), the lead ship of her class of patrol corvette

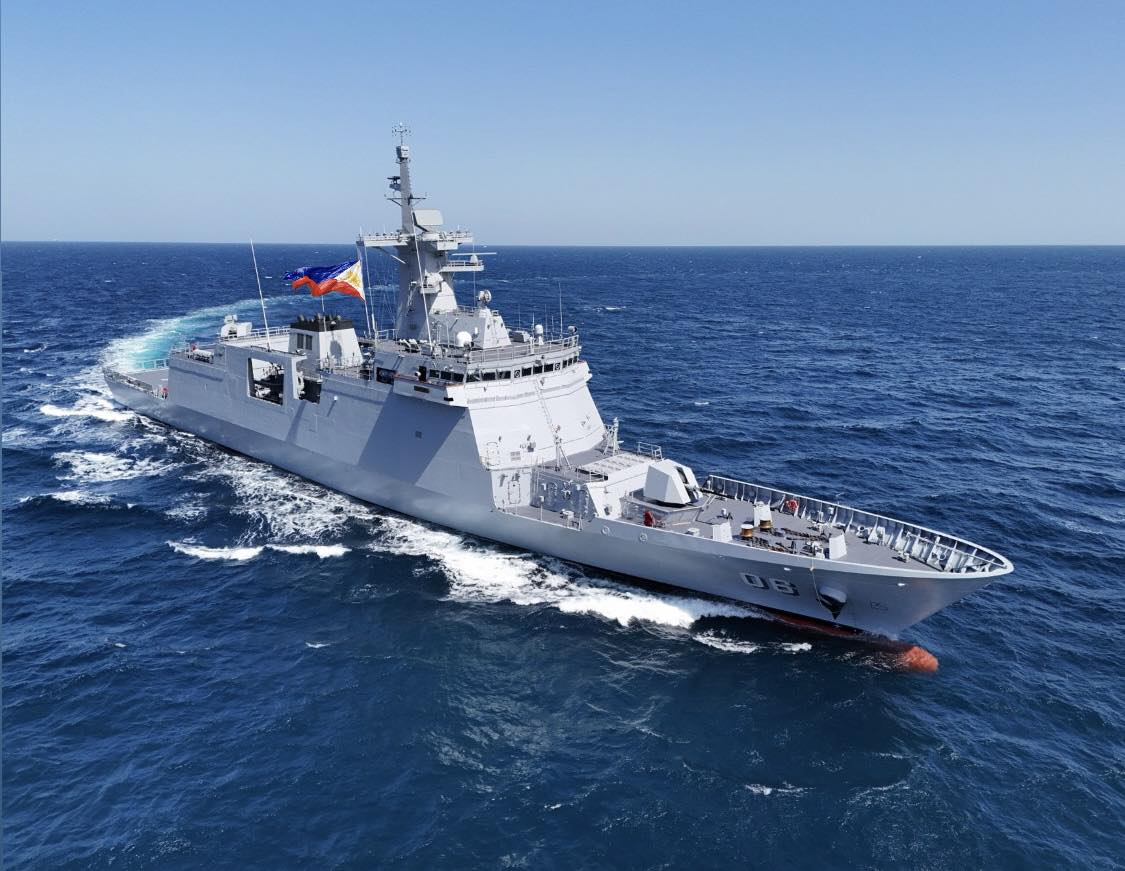
BRP Miguel Malvar (FFG-06), the lead ship of her class of guided missile frigate

Malvar Shrine in Santo Tomas, Batangas

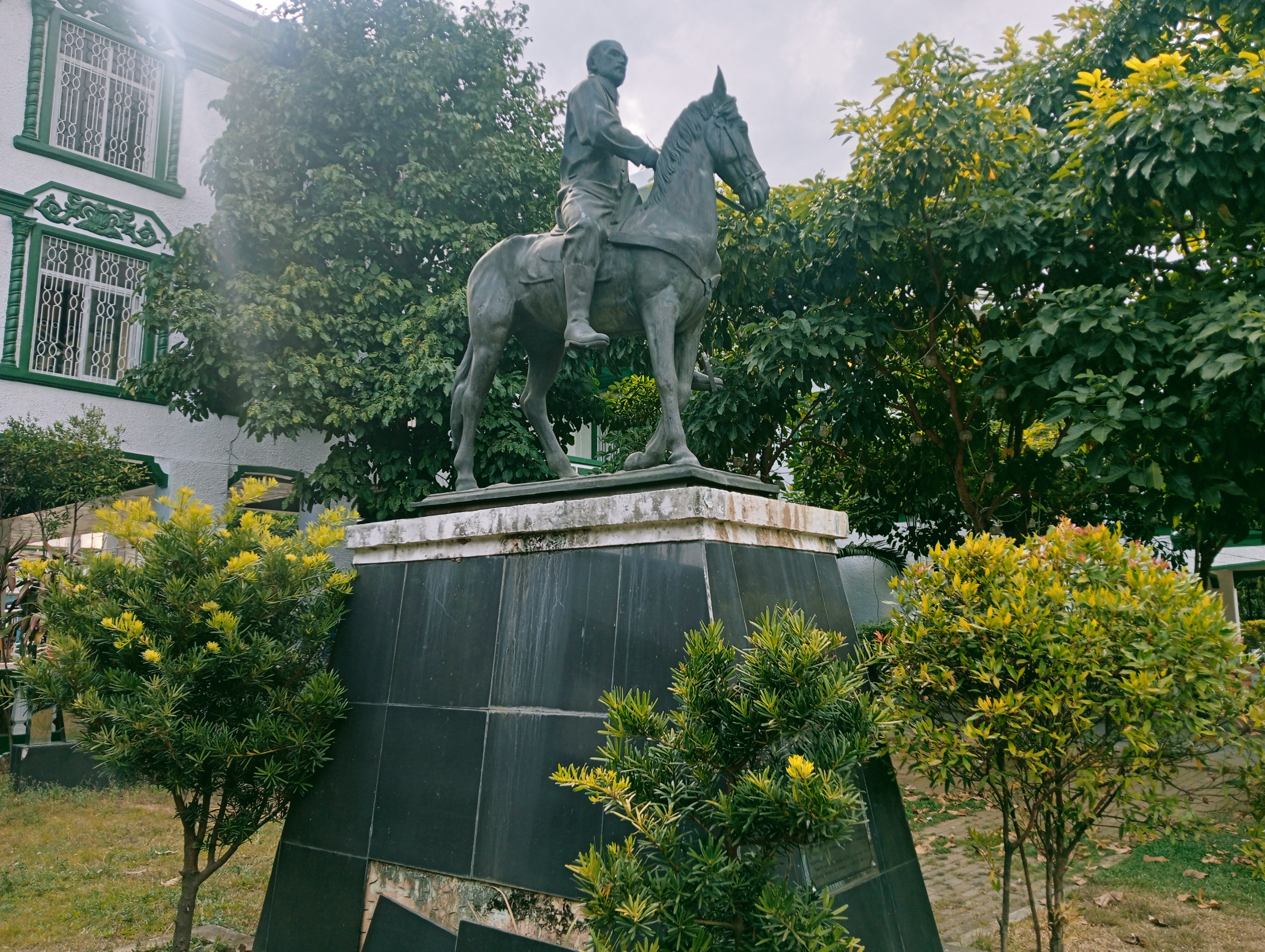
Miguel Malvar Monument in Malvar, Batangas

== See also ==
- List of unofficial presidents of the Philippines
