= BRP Diego Silang (FFG-7) =

Philippine Navy vessel

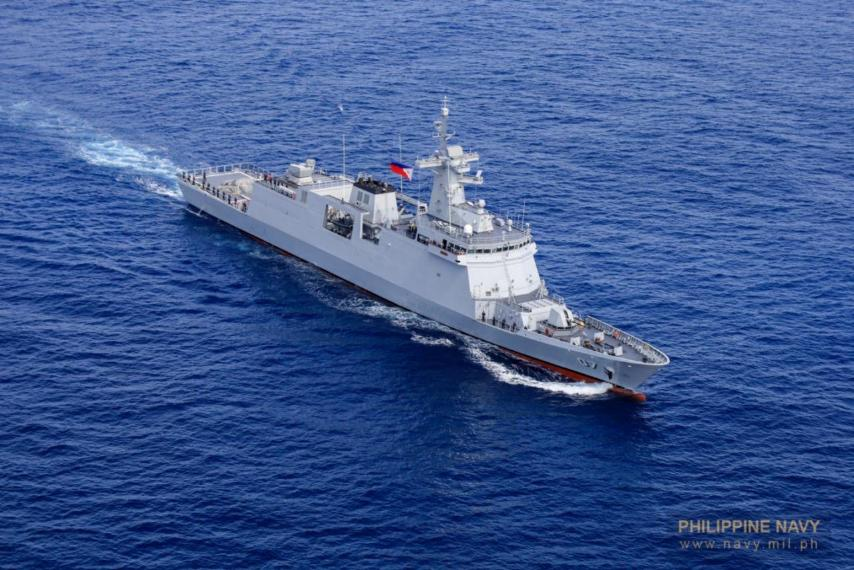
- BRP Diego Silang during its delivery sail to the Philippines.

Philippines
- Name: BRP Diego Silang
- Namesake: Diego Silang y Andaya
- Ordered: 28 December 2021
- Builder: HD Hyundai Heavy Industries
- Cost: PH₱12.5 billion (~US$250M)
- Yard number: P171
- Laid down: 14 June 2024
- Launched: 27 March 2025
- Commissioned: 02 December 2025
- Identification: FFG-7
- Status: Active
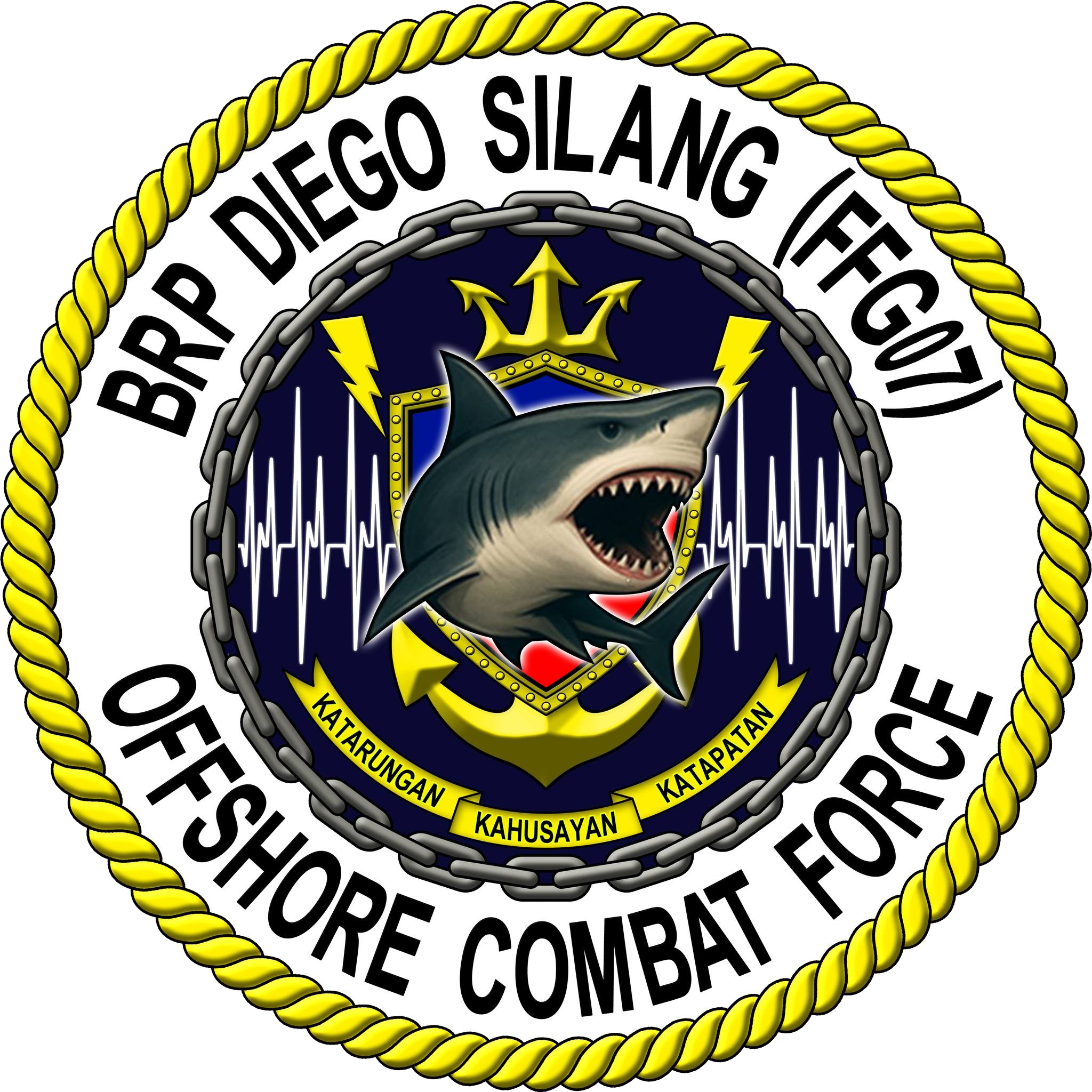
- Badge

General characteristics
- Type: Guided Missile Frigate
- Displacement: 3,200 tons
- Length: 118.4 m (388 ft 5 in)
- Beam: 14.9 m (48 ft 11 in)
- Draft: 3.7 m (12 ft 2 in)
- Depth: 7.2 m (23 ft 7 in)
- Installed power: 4 × MTU-STX diesel generators
- Propulsion: Combined diesel and diesel (CODAD) arrangement: 4 x MTU 20V 1163 M94, each rated at 7,400 kW (9,925 shp), total output: 29,600 kW (39,694 shp)
- Speed: 25 knots (46 km/h; 29 mph) at 85% MCR
- Range: 4,500 nmi (8,300 km; 5,200 mi) at 15 knots (28 km/h; 17 mph)
- Endurance: 20 days
- Boats & landing craft carried: 2 x 7.2m RHIBs in port and starboard boat bays
- Complement: 120
- Sensors & processing systems: Search radar: EL/M-2258 ALPHA S-band 3D AESA multifunction radar; Identification Friend or Foe (IFF) System; Navigation radar: Hensoldt SharpEye I-band & E/F-band radars; Fire control radar: Leonardo NA-25X fire control radar; Electro-Optical Tracking System: Safran PASEO XLR electro-optical; Tactical Data Link: Hanwha Systems Link P (Link K Derivative); Sonar: Harris Corp Model 997 medium-to-low frequency active/passive hull-mounted sonar
- Electronic warfare & decoys: SIGINT/ESM Suite: Elbit Elisra Aquamarine R-ESM (Radar-Electronic Support Measures); Elbit Elisra Aquamarine C-ESM (communications - electronic support measures); Countermeasures Dispensing System: 2 × C-Guard DL-12T mortar-type decoy launchers by Terma A/S
- Armament: Missiles; 16-cell Vertical Launching System for 16 x MBDA VL MICA ship-to-air missiles; 8 × C-Star SSM-710K antiship cruise missiles in quad configuration; Torpedoes; 2 × SEA triple-tube torpedo launching systems for K745 Blue Shark torpedoes; Guns; 1 × 76mm Oto Melara Super Rapid; 1 × Aselsan GOKDENIZ 100/35 CIWS; 4 × K6 (12.7mm) 50cal heavy machine gun
- Aircraft carried: 1 × AgustaWestland AW159 Wildcat or AW109 Power naval helicopter
- Aviation facilities: flight deck and starboard-side hangar for a 12-ton helicopter

BRP Diego Silang (FFG-7) is the second ship of the Miguel Malvar-class guided missile frigates of the Philippine Navy. She is the second ship to be named after Diego Silang y Andaya, a Filipino revolutionary leader who fought against Spanish colonial rule.

The warship was delivered to the Philippine Navy on 9 September 2025, and entered active service following commissioning on 2 December 2025.

== Construction and design ==
The BRP Diego Silang was designed and built by HD Hyundai Heavy Industries (HD HHI) of South Korea, and is based on the shipbuilder's HDC/HDF-3200 design, which in turn was a re-designed and enlarged HDF-2600 design used for the Jose Rizal-class frigate already in service with the Philippine Navy. The design was heavily influenced by the base design of the Incheon-class frigate built for the Republic of Korea Navy, but with heavy design developments and features found on newer frigates of the R.O.K. Navy, considering reduced radar cross-section by having cleaner lines, smooth surface design, reduced overhangs and a low free-board.

The first steel-cutting ceremony was held on 22 November 2023 at HD HHI's facility in Ulsan, South Korea. Her keel was laid on 14 June 2024, a few days before the launching of her sister ship BRP Miguel Malvar (FF-06). She was launched in December 2024.

== Service history ==
In March 2026, the ship participated in the Royal Australian Navy's Exercise Kakadu Fleet Review on Sydney Harbour. In June 2026, the ship encountered 4 warships from the People's Liberation Army Navy and exchanged radio challenges during its routine maritime patrol near the vicinity of Bajo de Masinloc (Scarborough Shoal).

== See also ==
- BRP Miguel Malvar (FFG-06)
- BRP Jose Rizal (FF-150)
- BRP Antonio Luna (FF-151)
- BRP Andres Bonifacio (PS-17)
