= Reshef-class corvette =

Israeli Navy ship class

Class overview
- Name: Reshef class
- Builders: Israel Shipyards Ltd.
- Operators: Israeli Navy
- Preceded by: Sa'ar 4.5-class missile boat
- Built: 2025–present
- Planned: 5
- Building: 5
- Completed: 0

General characteristics
- Class & type: Corvette
- Displacement: ~1000 tonnes
- Length: 80 m (262 ft 6 in)
- Beam: 11 m (36 ft 1 in)
- Draft: 3.25 m (10 ft 8 in)
- Sensors & processing systems: Search radar: IAI Elta EL/M-2258 ALPHA (Advanced Lightweight PHased Array) S-band multi-mission naval radar; Sonar: DSIT Solutions BlackFish hull mounted sonar / MonkFish torpedo detection and alert system (option)
- Electronic warfare & decoys: Countermeasures Dispensing System: 2 x Elbit Deseaver rocket decoy launchers; SIGINT/ESM Suite: Elbit Elisra Aqua Marine Radar Electronic Support Measures (R-ESM); Rafael Digital Shark Electronic Countermeasures (ECM)
- Armament: Guns: 1 x OTO 76/62 mm SR naval gun; 2 x Typhoon Weapon Station (25 or 30 mm); Missiles: 8 x Gabriel V anti-ship missiles (2 x 4-cell launchers); 40 x C-Dome (4 x 10-cell launchers); Typhoon MLS-NLOS (option); DEW: Naval Iron Beam (option); Additional: Various containerized payloads

The Reshef class (Hebrew: רֶשֶׁף) is a series of five multirole corvettes under construction for the Israeli Navy. The vessels are being built domestically at Israel Shipyards Ltd. in Haifa, northern Israel. The Navy officially ordered production of the vessels in 2024, with steel-cutting beginning in early 2025. The design is based on an enlarged version of Israel Shipyards' earlier Sa'ar S - 72 concept. The Reshef class is planned to replace the remaining in-service Sa'ar 4.5-class missile boats – called Nirit (Hebrew: נירית) in their upgraded form – with a larger ship having double the displacement, stealth features, and improved air defence & electronic warfare systems. As part of the contract there is an option for additional orders at a later date. The design is marketed for export as the Sa'ar S - 80.

== Development ==
=== Sa'ar S - 72 ===
Israel Shipyards privately began the design of a replacement for the Israeli Navy's aging Sa'ar 4.5 missile boats. Referred to as the Sa'ar S - 72, Israel Shipyards officially revealed the new design at the International Maritime Defence Exhibition (IMDEX) Asia in Singapore in May 2013. The 800-tonne displacement concept was 72 meters long, with a beam of 10.25 meters and a draft of less than 3 meters. The plans included a 15.3-meter-long flight deck accommodating up to a 7-ton medium helicopter. Powered by two MTU 16V1163M94 diesel engines, the ship was designed for a top speed of over 30 knots with a cruising speed of 18 knots.

=== Navy redesign ===
On November 6, 2019, the Israeli Navy signed an initial design contract with Israel Shipyards for a new vessel, now dubbed the "Reshef" class. The yard's managing director stated the new design would be even longer and have a larger displacement than the previous Sa'ar S-72 proposals. The Navy had also specified the rear deck would house modular payloads rather than a helicopter flight deck. A contract for detailed design work was signed by the Israeli Ministry of Defense in August 2021

=== Reshef order ===
On December 12, 2024, Israel Shipyards announced that the Israeli Ministry of Defence had signed a contract for the production and delivery of five Reshef class corvettes. The deal was valued at $780M (NIS 2.8B). The contract includes the option for additional orders in future. A formal steel-cutting ceremony marking the start of construction occurred on February 18, 2025.

== Characteristics ==
=== Reshef ===
The exact specifications and loadout of the Reshef class vessels are still not enumerated, however various systems have been mentioned by the designers or shown on the latest models.

The ships are expected to feature an EL/M-2258 ALPHA rotating AESA radar, as well as various other radar and electro-optical sensors. For anti-missile decoys, the ships appear to have multiple Elbit Deseaver decoy systems. Digital Shark R-ECM and Aqua Marine series R-ESM electronic warfare systems are likely present. DSIT Solutions BlackFish hull mounted sonar and MonkFish Torpedo Detection and Alert System (TDAS) have been mentioned as optional systems for anti-submarine warfare. The design features a multipurpose aft deck that can be used to store containerized payloads such as deck-launched torpedoes, UAVs, or additional missile launchers.

For weapons; an OTO 76/62 mm Super Rapid naval gun is the primary gun, while 2 Typhoon Weapon Stations provide close-in defense. A key new feature the class will share with Israel's newest Sa'ar 6-class corvette is a 40-cell C-Dome point defense system, a navalized variant of the Iron Dome. For surface-to-surface combat, canisters for launching sea-skimming Gabriel V anti-ship missiles are present on deck.

The Reshef class is also expected to be the first of Israel's fleet to be fitted with Naval Iron Beam, a navalized version of the Iron Beam directed energy weapon. Additional short range surface-to-surface missiles could be fitted such as the Typhoon MLS-NLOS system, the navalized Spike-NLOS missile launcher.

=== Sa'ar S - 80 ===
Israel Shipyards advertise an export version of the Reshef class design, dubbed the Sa'ar S - 80, revealed at the Euronaval 2022 exhibition. The vessel is described as being 80 meters long with a beam of 11 meters and a draft of 3.25 meters. Powered by 4 MTU 16V4000 series diesel engines in CODAD configuration, the maximum speed is claimed to be over 28 knots with a cruising speed of 14 knots. The ship is marketed as being available in corvette or offshore patrol vessel (OPV) variants. Endurance is rated at over 22 days, while crew complement is stated as 53 + 20 passengers. The stern hosts a landing deck for a medium size naval helicopter — this space on the Reshef class is to be used for modular containerized payloads instead. No hangar is present, however one could potentially be provided for operators having this requirement. 2 davit stations for rigid-hulled inflatable boats (RHIBs) also occupy the aft deck, where Gabriel V launchers will be emplaced on the Israeli Navy's design.

== Ships in class ==
Name	Shipyard	Status	Contract	Steel cutting	Launched	Comm.	Notes
Israeli Navy - 5 ordered
INS TBA	Israel Shipyards	Under construction	12 Dec 2024	18 Feb 2025	TBA	TBA	
INS TBA	Israel Shipyards	Under construction	12 Dec 2024	18 Feb 2025	TBA	TBA	
INS TBA	Israel Shipyards	Under construction	12 Dec 2024	18 Feb 2025	TBA	TBA	
INS TBA	Israel Shipyards	Under construction	12 Dec 2024	18 Feb 2025	TBA	TBA	
INS TBA	Israel Shipyards	Under construction	12 Dec 2024	18 Feb 2025	TBA	TBA	

== See also ==
- Sa'ar 62-class offshore patrol vessel
- Sa'ar 5-class corvette
- Sa'ar 6-class corvette
