= EL/M-2258 ALPHA =

Israeli naval defense radar system

- Country of origin: Israel
- Type: Solid-state Multi-function Advanced Lightweight Phased Array Naval Radars
- Frequency: S band
- Range: Latest Release: 400 km (extended version) 200 km (basic version) Old Release: Automatic track initiation at 120+ km for high altitude fighter size aircraft. 25+ km against sea skimming missiles.
- Azimuth: 360°
- Elevation: 70°

The EL/M-2258 ALPHA ("Advanced Lightweight Phased Array") is a multi-function active electronically scanned array naval radar system. It was developed by IAI Elta, for maritime installation on medium-sized combat ships such as corvettes, frigates and larger vessels. It is capable of tracking both air and surface targets, providing fire control and splash spotting guidance with target classification. ALPHA is an acronym of Advanced Lightweight Phased Array Naval Radars.

== Operators ==
The radar is installed in medium-sized combat ships of the Israeli navy.

Israel

- Sa'ar 4.5-class missile boat
- Sa'ar 5-class corvette

Philippines

- Miguel Malvar-class frigate

Future Operators

Israel

- Reshef-class corvette
