= Miguel Malvar-class frigate =

Guided missile frigates in service with the Philippines Navy

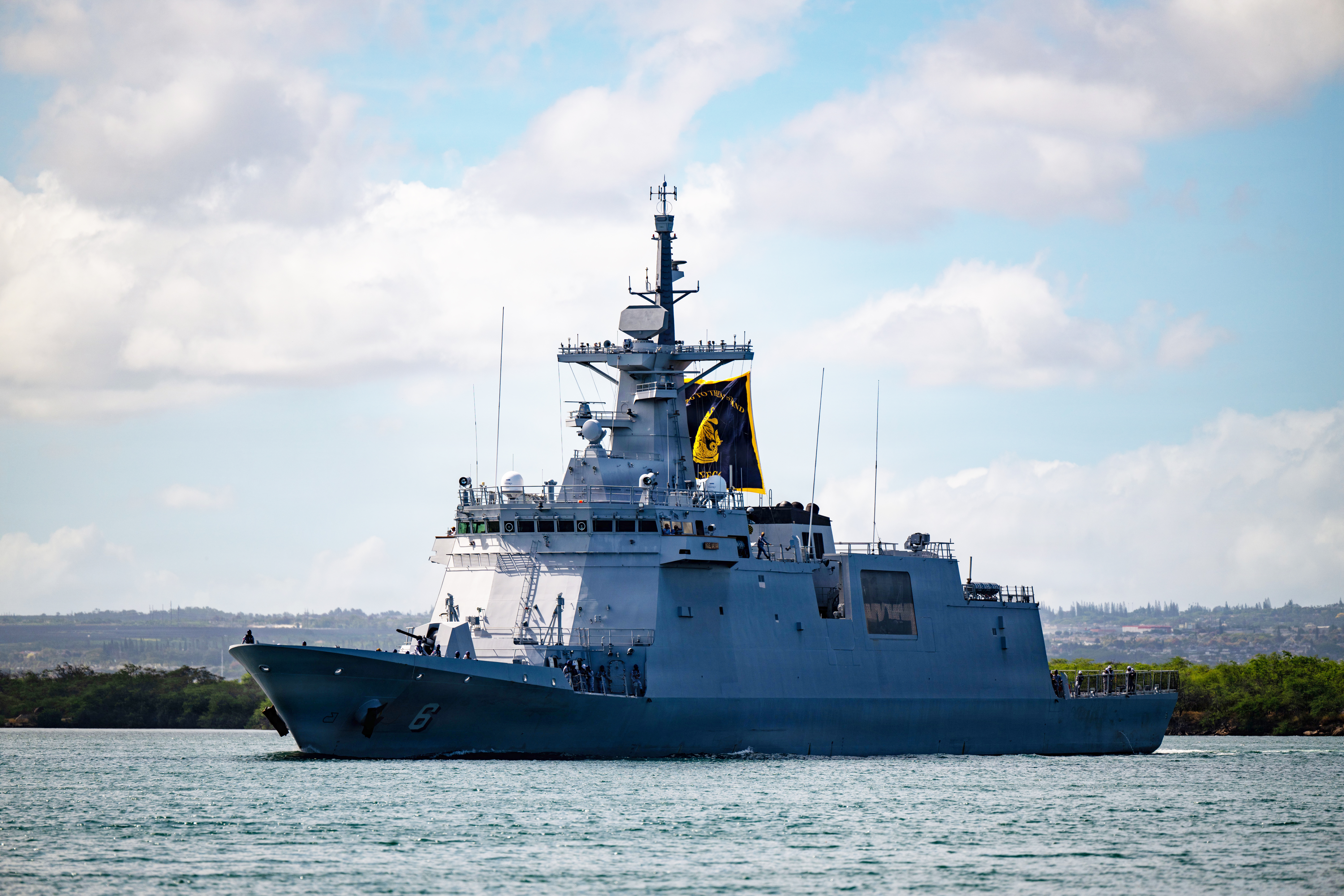
- BRP Miguel Malvar (FFG-6) departs from Joint Base Pearl Harbor-Hickam to participate in the sea phase of RIMPAC 2026

Class overview
- Name: Miguel Malvar class
- Builders: Hyundai Heavy Industries
- Operators: Philippine Navy
- Preceded by: Jose Rizal class
- Built: 2023–2026
- In commission: 2025–present
- Planned: 4
- Building: 2
- Completed: 2
- Active: 2

General characteristics
- Type: Guided Missile Frigate
- Displacement: 3,200 tons
- Length: 118.4 m (388 ft 5 in)
- Beam: 14.9 m (48 ft 11 in)
- Draft: 3.7 m (12 ft 2 in)
- Depth: 7.2 m (23 ft 7 in)
- Installed power: 4 × MTU-STX diesel generators
- Propulsion: Combined diesel and diesel (CODAD) arrangement: 4 x MTU 20V 1163 M94, each rated at 7,400 kW (9,925 shp), total output: 29,600 kW (39,694 shp)
- Speed: 25 knots (46 km/h; 29 mph) at 85% MCR
- Range: 4,500 nmi (8,300 km; 5,200 mi) at 15 knots (28 km/h; 17 mph)
- Endurance: 20 days
- Boats & landing craft carried: 2 x 7.2m RHIBs in port and starboard boat bays
- Complement: 120
- Sensors & processing systems: Search radar: EL/M-2258 ALPHA S-band 3D AESA multifunction radar; Identification Friend or Foe (IFF) System; Navigation radar: Hensoldt SharpEye I-band & E/F-band radars; Fire control radar: Leonardo NA-25X fire control radar; Electro-Optical Tracking System: Safran PASEO XLR electro-optical; Tactical Data Link: Hanwha Systems Link P (Link K Derivative); Sonar: Harris Model 997 medium frequency active/passive hull mounted sonar
- Electronic warfare & decoys: SIGINT/ESM Suite: Elbit Elisra Aquamarine R-ESM (Radar-Electronic Support Measures); Elbit Elisra Aquamarine C-ESM (communications - electronic support measures); Countermeasures Dispensing System: 2 × C-Guard DL-12T mortar-type decoy launchers by Terma A/S
- Armament: Missiles; Flight I: 16-cell Vertical Launching System for 16 x MBDA VL MICA ship-to-air missiles; 8 × C-Star SSM-710K antiship cruise missiles in quad configuration; Torpedoes; 2 × SEA triple-tube torpedo launching systems for K745 Blue Shark torpedoes; Guns; 1 × 76mm Oto Melara Super Rapid; 1 × Aselsan GOKDENIZ 100/35 CIWS; 4 × K6 (12.7mm) 50cal heavy machine gun
- Aircraft carried: 1 × AW159 Wildcat multi-role naval helicopter, with: K745 Blue Shark torpedoes; FLASH compact dipping sonar; Sonobuoys; Spike NLOS missiles; Seaspray 7400E AESA X-band; MX-15Di EOIR cameras; 2 × pintle-mounted machine guns
- Aviation facilities: flight deck and starboard-side hangar for a 12-ton helicopter

The Miguel Malvar-class frigate is a class of frigates designed and currently built by Hyundai Heavy Industries (HHI) for the Philippine Navy. It was previously known as the HDC-3100 corvette based on the company's product nomenclature system and the service's acquisition project name until it was reclassified to frigate "FF" and then to its current "FFG" guided-missile frigate designation.

== Development ==
=== Concept design ===
The Philippine Navy included plans to procure two new guided missile corvettes as part of its Horizon 2 modernization phase, with the proposal with a budget of PHP28 billion (US$550 million) During the pre-procurement development phase, the Technical Working Group (TWG) assigned for the project has used the Philippine Navy's latest warship, the Jose Rizal-class frigate as baseline for the new corvettes, while improvements will be added based on lessons learned from the said frigate's development and construction from 2016 to 2020.

Based on open source information, the new corvette would be more or less similar in size to the Jose Rizal-class frigate, but will have improved sensors and weapons suite.

Sensors were believed to include the following:

- an improved combat management system (CMS) compared to the one installed on the Jose Rizal-class frigate;
- an AESA 3D air/surface search radar system, an improvement over the non-AESA system on the Jose Rizal-class frigate;
- a secondary surface search/navigation radar system;
- a fire control radar (FCR);
- an electro-optical tracking system (EOTS);
- a radar electronic support measures (R-ESM) system;
- a hull mounted sonar (HMS);
- a towed array sonar (TAS) which would be included upon delivery, compared to being a "fitted for but not with" (FFBNW) subsystem on the Jose Rizal-class frigate;

Weapon systems will include the following:

- an Oto Melara 76mm Super Rapid naval gun, carried over for commonality with other existing ships;
- one or two 30mm secondary naval guns: Rafael Typhoon, or BAE Systems Mk.38 Mk.3, or Aselsan SMASH, or MSI Defence DS30, all of which are already in service with the Philippine Navy;
- a gun-based close-in weapon system (CIWS);
- at least four manually operated 12.7mm heavy machine guns;
- two quadruple missile launchers for medium-range anti-ship missiles;
- a 16-cell vertical launching system (VLS) for short-medium range surface-to-air missiles;
- two triple lightweight anti-submarine torpedo launchers

The project was divided into two lots. Lot 1 was allocated PHP25 billion for the procurement of the corvette and weapon systems, and Lot 2 with a budget of PHP3 billion for the procurement of the ships' munitions.

=== Selection ===
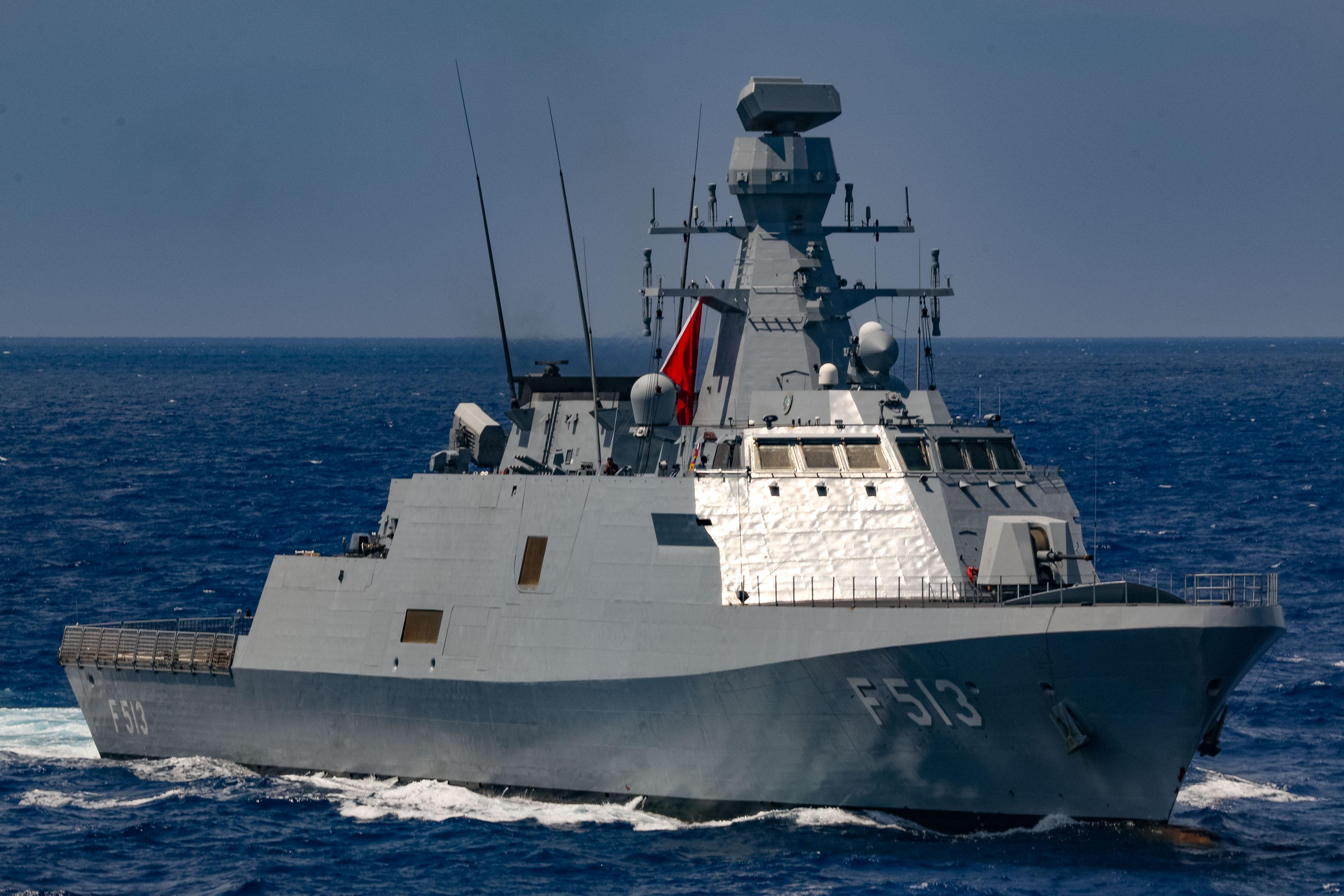
A variant of the Turkish Naval Forces' Ada-class corvette was offered by ASFAT for the Philippine Navy's new corvette program

Several offers were made to the Philippine Navy to meet the requirements for new corvettes, including proposals coming from South Korea's Hyundai Heavy Industries, Turkey's ASFAT, Israel Shipyards, Germany's ThyssenKrupp Marine Systems (TKMS), France's Naval Group, Dutch shipbuilder Damen Group, and India's Goa Shipyard.

The Department of National Defense eventually decided for the project to be procured under negotiated process, and undertaken through Government-to-Government (G2G) process, which means a support and participation of the government of the shipbuilder's country of origin.

By 2021, South Korea's Hyundai Heavy Industries and Turkey's ASFAT were shortlisted for the project. HHI offered their HDC-3100 corvette design. On the other hand, ASFAT offered a revised version of their Ada-class corvette.

Ultimately, Hyundai Heavy Industries was selected as the winning contractor for the project's Lot 1, with a Notice of Award released by the DND on 15 December 2021, and a contract signed on 28 December 2021.

On 22 December 2025, DND issued a Notice of Award to HHI for the acquisition of two additional frigates for the Philippine Navy, with the contract signed on 26 December 2025.

=== HHI HDC-3100 design ===
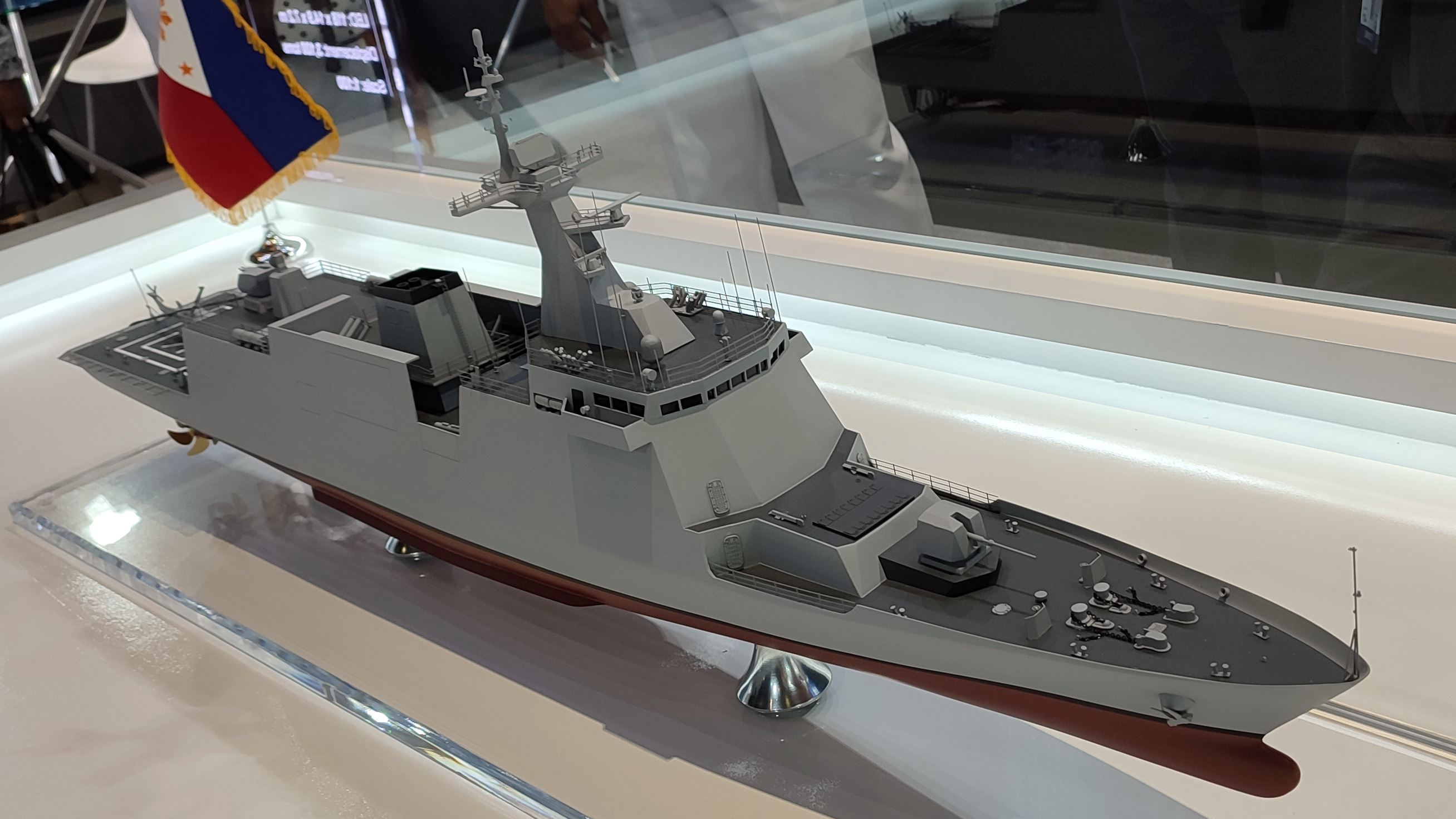
Front view of the scale model of the HDC-3100 corvette design from HHI

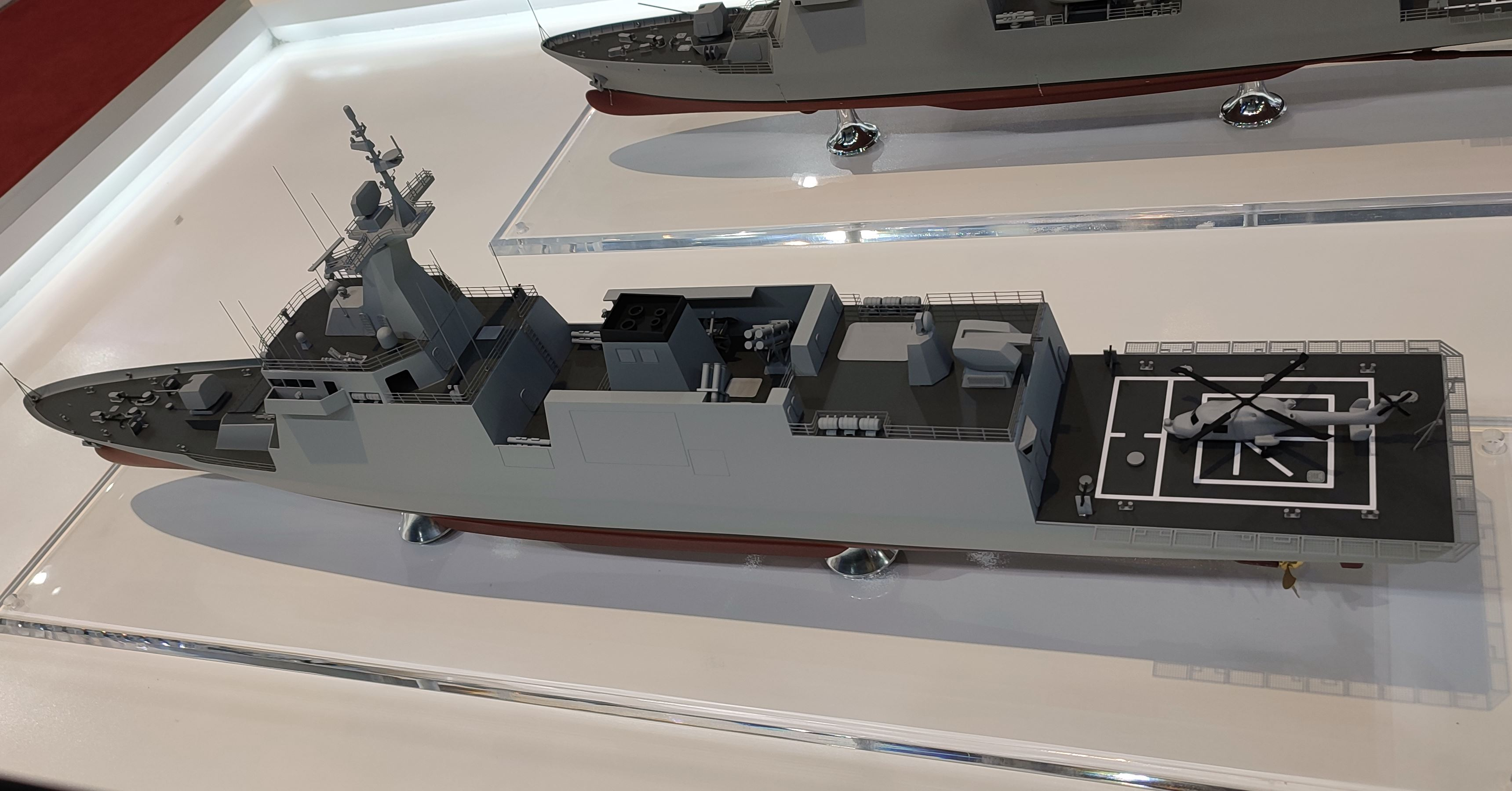
Another view of the scale model of the same HDC-3100 corvette design

Hyundai Heavy Industries' HDC-3100 corvette design, also known as the HDF-3100 frigate design, will become the benchmark design for the Philippine Navy's future frigate. It is an improved design of the HDF-2600 which was used on the Jose Rizal-class frigate, with a longer hull and a heavier displacement to accommodate increased subsystem requirements of the Philippine Navy.

The benchmark HDC-3100 has a length of 116 meters, a breadth of 14.8 meters, and a displacement of 3,100 tons, and will have a Combined Diesel and Diesel (CODAD) propulsion configuration allowing a maximum speed in excess of 25 knots and a range of up to 4,500 nautical miles.

It has space for a 76 mm primary naval gun in A position, a 16-cell VLS (with space for 16 more) behind the primary naval gun, torpedo launchers on both port and starboard sides, and a gun-based close-in weapon system above the helicopter hangar. Aside from the CIWS, there is no more small-caliber secondary gun as previously expected.

The space for the vertical launching system has been lengthened to accommodate a 16-cell system, and helicopter landing deck also appears to have been lengthened to allow longer helicopter designs.

=== Confirmed subsystems ===
South Korean defense company Hanwha Systems has secured a contract to supply the new corvette's combat management system (CMS). It was confirmed to be the Naval Shield Integrated Combat Management System Baseline 4.

UK-based defense company SEA has been contracted by Hyundai Heavy Industries to supply the torpedo launching systems for the new corvettes, with SEA delivering two of their TLS systems to each of the corvettes. The SEA TLS can be used to launch a variety of torpedo models including the US Mark 44, Mark 46 and Mark 54 torpedoes, the UK Sting Ray, the Italian A244-S, French MU90 Impact, and the South Korean K745 Blue Shark torpedoes.

Israel Aerospace Industries (IAI) Elta Systems was awarded a contract to supply the new corvettes with their ELM-2258 Advanced Lightweight Phased Array (ALPHA) 3D active electronically scanned array (AESA) air/surface search radar system. The ELM-2258 ALPHA can provide 360° radar coverage, and can track low-flying targets within a range of 25 kilometers and high-flying ones within a range of 250 kilometers in complex environments.

Hensoldt UK was awarded a contract to supply Mk11 SharpEye navigation radars for HHI's Philippine Navy ship projects. The radars will be fitted on both the 3,200-ton corvettes and the 2,400-ton offshore patrol vessels currently being developed and constructed by HHI for the Philippine Navy. These radars will provide navigation and surface search capabilities for the vessels.

In an interview with Naval News, Safran has confirmed that their PASEO XLR extra long range optronic identification & fire control system will be installed on the 2 HDC-3100 corvettes and 6 HDP-2200 offshore patrol vessels being built by HD Hyundai for the Philippine Navy.

IMENCO announced in 2023 that the company won a contract from Electrix Co. Ltd to provide CCTV systems to the corvettes.

=== Flight II ===
On 29 December 2025, HD Hyundai Heavy Industries announced they will be supplying the Philippine Navy with two additional 3,200-ton frigates. Delivery is planned for 2029. South Korea's Hanwha Systems was awarded a KRW40 billion (approx US$27.7 million) contract to supply Combat Management Systems and Tactical Data Links for the two new frigates.

According to HD HHI, the second batch of Miguel Malvar-class frigates would feature combat enhancements and improved crew accommodations over the initial vessels.

=== Flight III ===
During the Department of National Defense (DND) budget hearing in the House of Representatives in late August 2026, Defense Secretary Gilberto Teodoro Jr. responded, “Definitely, your honor, there is an intent really to acquire, but the trigger has not yet been pulled".

This confirms the DND's intent to pursue a Flight III (the 5th and 6th vessels) of the Miguel Malvar-class frigates, with the actual contract and construction pending the release of unprogrammed funds or allocations in the upcoming 2027 defense budget. South Korean shipbuilder HD Hyundai Heavy Industries is reportedly targeting to secure this specific contract by the end of 2026 or early 2027.

== Construction ==
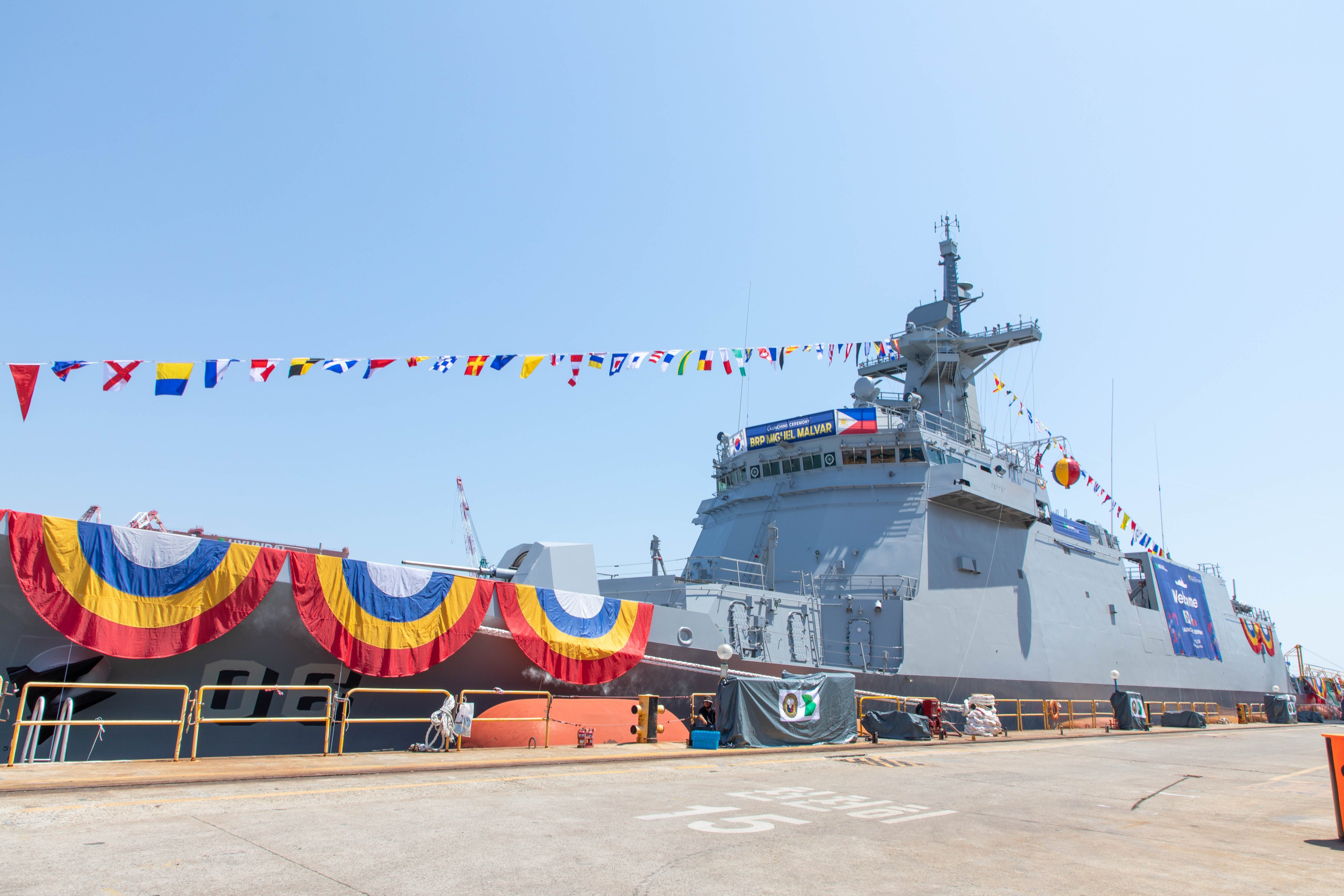
BRP Miguel Malvar has launched by HD Hyundai Heavy Industries in Ulsan, South Korea

Construction on the first ship, designated project no. P170, commenced with the steel cutting ceremony on 11 May 2023, and 22 November 2023 for the second ship, designated project no. P171.

In 2023 September interview with DZBB to vice commander Rear Adm. Caesar Bernard Valencia, he estimated that the navy would receive the two ordered HDC-3100 corvettes starting around 2025–2026.

On 12 April 2024 it was announced that the Department of Budget and Management (DBM) released around US$106 million to fund the construction of the corvettes. On 4 June 2024, weeks before the first frigate was launched by HD Hyundai Heavy Industries, Octaviano Enterprises revealed in an image of a plaque for the Offshore Combat Force's 36th Founding Anniversary, showing what will be the names of the future corvettes, then reclassified into frigates - BRP Miguel Malvar (FF-06), and BRP Diego Silang (FF-07).

On 18 June 2024 BRP Miguel Malvar was launched at HHI's Ulsan shipyards with sea trials to commence prior to its delivery to the Philippine Navy by 2025. The launch ceremony was attended by Defense Secretary Gilberto Teodoro Jr, his wife Special Envoy to the United Nations Children's Fund Monica Louise Prieto-Teodoro, Armed Forces of the Philippines Chief Gen. Romeo Brawner, Philippine Navy Chief Vice Adm. Toribio Adaci Jr and other military officials.

== Operational history ==
During the Philippine Navy's 127th founding anniversary on 20 May 2025, the leading ship BRP Miguel Malvar was officially commissioned into active duty, alongside the Acero-class Fast Attack Interdiction Craft BRP Albert Majini (PG-909).

== Ships in class ==
Name	Hull number	Builder	Steel Cutting	Laid down	Launch	Delivery	Commissioning	Status
BRP Miguel Malvar	FFG-6	Hyundai Heavy Industries	11 May 2023	22 November 2023	18 June 2024	08 April 2025	20 May 2025	Active
BRP Diego Silang	FFG-7	Hyundai Heavy Industries	22 November 2023	14 June 2024	27 March 2025	8 September 2025	2 December 2025	Active
TBC	FFG-8	Hyundai Heavy Industries	4 November 2026	TBC	TBC	2027	TBC	Under construction
TBC	FFG-9	Hyundai Heavy Industries	TBC	TBC	TBC	TBC	TBC	On Order

either scheduled or estimated dates

== See also ==
- List of frigate classes in service

Equivalent frigates of the same era

- Istanbul class
- FF(X)
- Mogami class
- Chungnam class
- Tamandaré class
- FDI
