= Jose Rizal-class frigate =

Philippine Navy Frigate

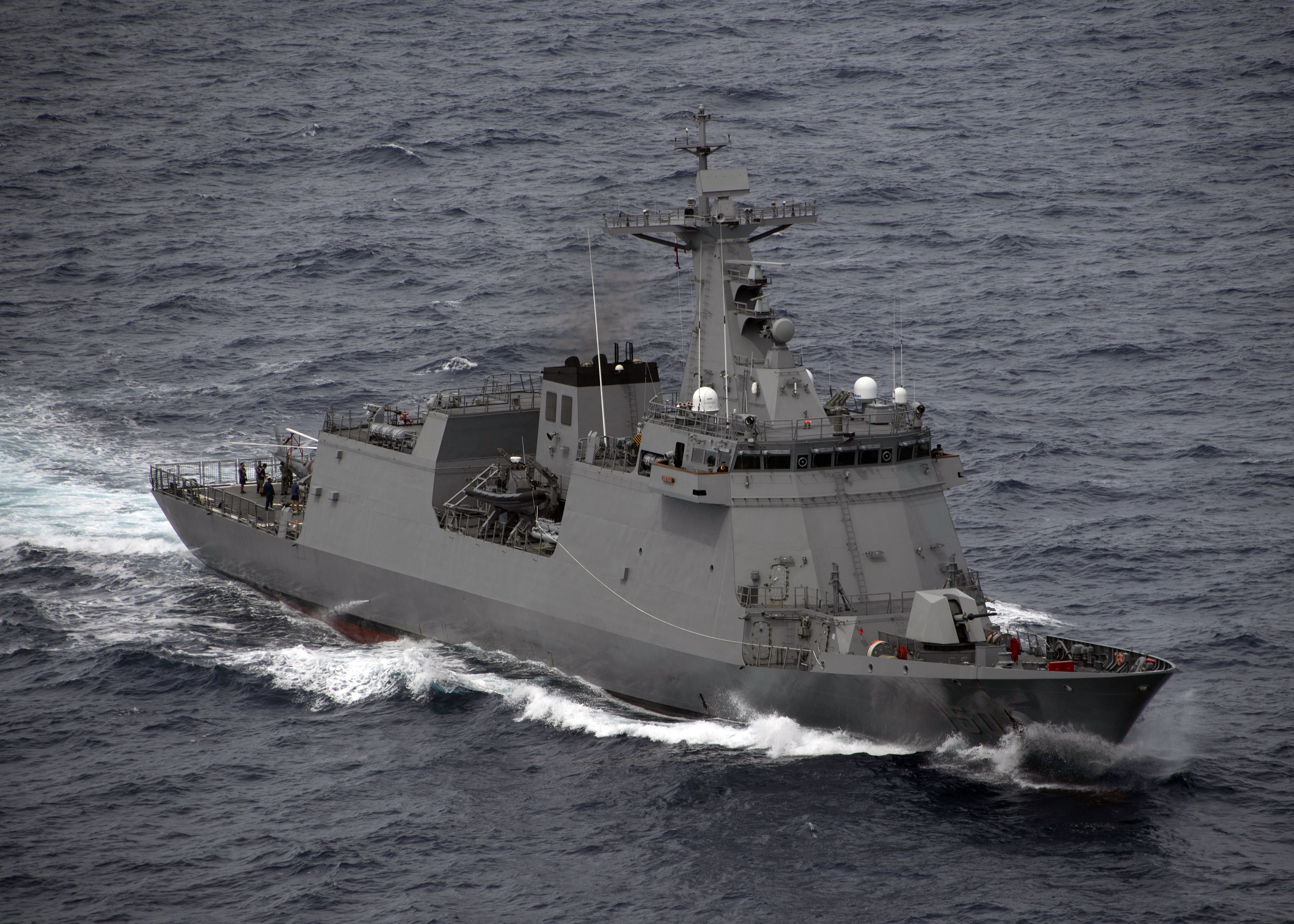
- BRP Jose Rizal during RIMPAC 2020

Class overview
- Name: Jose Rizal class
- Builders: Hyundai Heavy Industries
- Operators: Philippine Navy
- Preceded by: Andrés Bonifacio-class frigate; Gregorio del Pilar-class offshore patrol vessel
- Succeeded by: Miguel Malvar-class frigate
- Cost: $168.456M or ₱7.872B per ship in 2016 August Notice of Award phase (excluding ammunitions) (Note: Cost excludes CIWS, VDS, VLS, and Link-16 module as those are FFBNW items. To note, cost also excludes CESM and demagnetization equipment as those are neither mentioned in the official required specs nor even mentioned as FFBNW items; those two items are usually found as (either preinstalled or FFBNW) on many contemporary combat frigates and combat corvettes, including JR-class frigates' direct successor the Malvar-class frigates which both come as preinstalled.)
- Built: 2018 – 2020
- In commission: 2020 – present
- Completed: 2
- Active: 2

General characteristics
- Type: Guided Missile Frigate
- Displacement: 2,600 tons
- Length: 107.5 m (352 ft 8 in)
- Beam: 13.8 m (45 ft 3 in)
- Draft: 3.65 m (12 ft 0 in)
- Depth: 6.9 m (22 ft 8 in)
- Installed power: 4 × MTU-STX 12V2000-M41B diesel generators, each producing around 650 kW (872 shp)
- Propulsion: Combined diesel and diesel (CODAD) arrangement: 4 × MTU-STX 12V1163-TB93 12-cylinder diesel engines
- Speed: 25 knots (46 km/h; 29 mph) at 85% MCR
- Range: 4,500 nmi (8,300 km; 5,200 mi) at 15 knots (28 km/h; 17 mph)
- Endurance: 30 days
- Boats & landing craft carried: 2 × RHIBs
- Complement: Accommodation for 110 persons: Crew: 65; Non-organic: 25; Additional personnel: 20
- Sensors & processing systems: Combat Management System: Naval Shield Baseline 2 Integrated CMS; Search & Track Radar: TRS-3D Baseline D phased array C-band (NATO G-band) multi-mode naval radar by Hensoldt (formerly EADS); Identification Friend or Foe (IFF) System: MSSR 2000i by Hensoldt; Secondary Radars: SharpEye™ X-band (NATO I band) & S-band (NATO E/F bands) solid-state navigation & search radars by Kelvin Hughes (Hensoldt UK in 2017); Fire Control System: NA-25X by Selex ES; EO-IR (electro-optical, infrared) Sensors: PASEO NS by Safran; Tactical Data Links: Link P (Link K Derivative) by Hanwha Systems; Sonar Suite: Model 997 medium-to-low frequency active/passive hull-mounted sonar by Harris Corp (L3Harris Technologies in 2019); IPMS: Servowatch integrated platform management system
- Electronic warfare & decoys: RESM: Aquamarine's NS9300A ELINT component by Elbit Systems; EW Countermeasures: 2 × C-Guard DL-6T mortar-type decoy launchers by Terma A/S; Countermeasure Munitions: Bullfighter RF & IR decoys by Rheinmetall-Denel Munitions; CANTO acoustic-decoys by Naval Group
- Armament: Missiles; 2 × 2-canister C-Star SSM-710K antiship cruise missiles; 2 × Simbad-RC twin-Mistral missile launchers; Torpedoes; 2 × SEA triple torpedo launching systems for K745 Blue Shark torpedoes; Guns; 1 × OTO-Melara 76/62SR dual-purpose rapid-fire autocannon; 1 × Aselsan SMASH 200/25 30mm remote weapon station cannon; 4 × K6 12.7mm (.50 cal) heavy machine Guns
- Armor: Collective Protection System (CPS) against NBC threats; Protection against the wider CBRNE threats
- Aircraft carried: 1 × AW159 Wildcat multi-role naval helicopter, with: K745 Blue Shark torpedoes; FLASH compact dipping sonar; Sonobuoys; Spike NLOS missiles; Seaspray 7400E AESA X-band; MX-15Di EOIR cameras; 2 × pintle-mounted machine guns
- Aviation facilities: flight deck for a 12-ton helicopter; aft-hangar (starboard side) for a 10-ton helicopter
- Notes: hull: high-tensile metal, combined transverse-longitudinal framing build system, sufficient thickness to survive sea state 7

The Jose Rizal class of multi-role general purpose frigates, currently in service with the Philippine Navy, are a heavily modified variant of the Republic of Korea Navy's Incheon-class frigates. The ships, which were built by Hyundai Heavy Industries (HHI), are specifically accommodated to fit the requirements of the Philippine Navy. The introduction of the frigates improved the capabilities of the Philippine Navy's Offshore Combat Force.

== Development ==
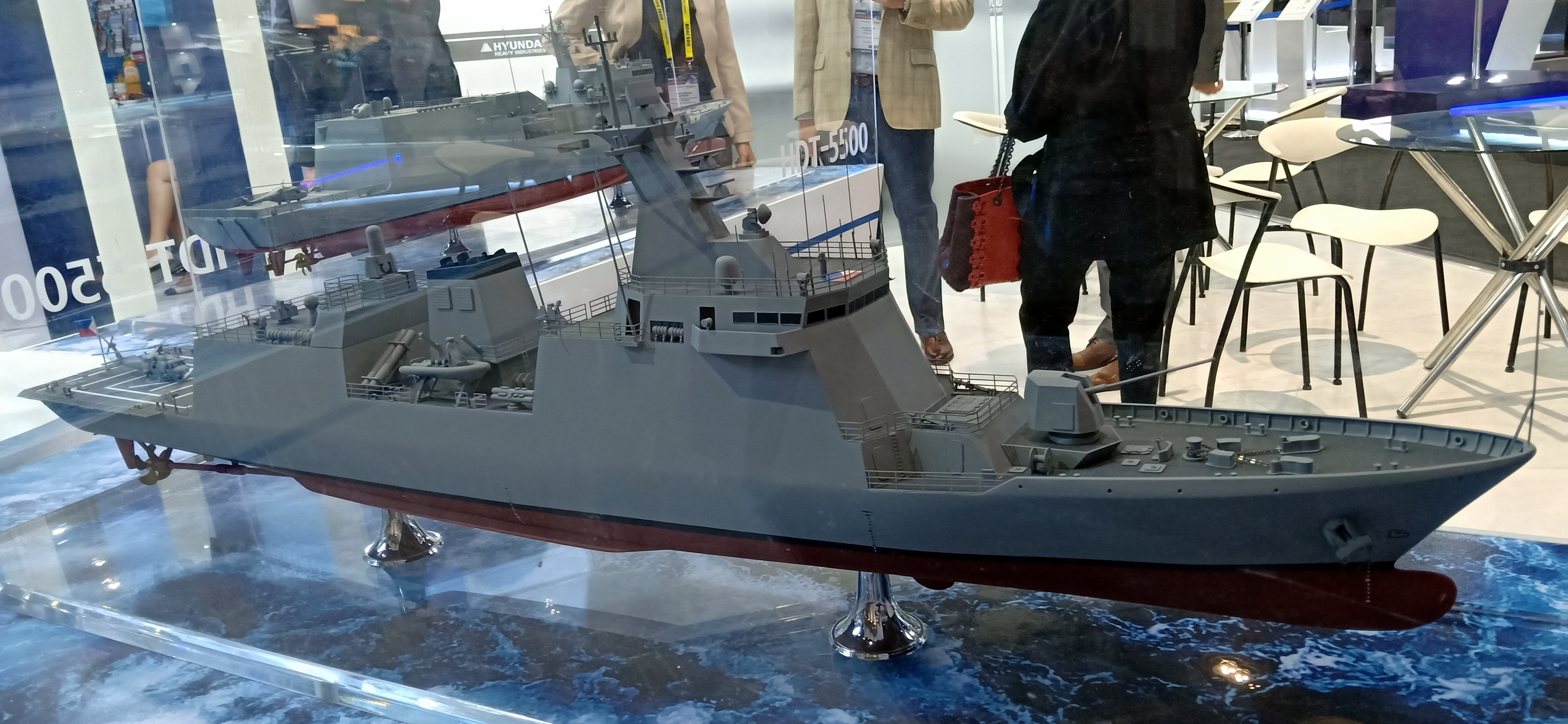
A scale model of HDF-2600 Frigate during ADAS 2018

=== First stage bid ===
In May 2013, the Department of National Defense opened the "Frigate Acquisition Project", calling for the acquisition of two brand new frigates for the Philippine Navy with the contract price of Php 18 billion (around US$437 million as of May 2013). This is after rejecting the proposal to procure two Maestrale-class frigates from Italy due to a preference for acquiring new ships. The tender was a two-stage bidding system, with proponents needing to pass the initial bid stage by meeting the minimum requirements set by the program, before finalizing their offers and submitting their second and final bid.

Seven bidders participated in the first stage bid, namely Garden Reach Shipbuilders & Engineers (GRSE) of India, STX France SA, Navantia SA of Spain, Hyundai Heavy Industries (HHI) of South Korea, STX Offshore & Shipbuilding Co. Ltd. of South Korea, Daewoo Shipbuilding & Marine Engineering (DSME) of South Korea, and ThyssenKrupp Marine Systems (TKMS) of Germany. For the 1st stage bidding, only four shipbuilders were declared as qualified, with GRSE, STX France, and TKMS disqualified for failing to meet documentation requirements. A Motion for Reconsideration was provided by GRSE and STX France, which was accepted by the DND Bids and Awards Committee. GRSE was reported to be the lowest bidder. The shipyard offered a design based on the Indian Navy's Kamorta-class corvette.

=== Pre-second stage bid changes ===
With six proponents passing the first stage bidding phase, successive meetings were held with the Philippine Navy, wherein the DND found out restrictions in the export of munitions through third party shipbuilders. This paved the way for the split of the project into two lots by August 2014:

- Lot 1, with an Approved Budget for Contract (ABC) worth Php 15.5 billion (around US$348 million as of August 2014), covering for the platform (ship hull and all working components, guns, and missile and torpedo launchers), and
- Lot 2, with an ABC worth Php 2.5 billion (around US$56 million) for munitions, missiles, and torpedoes.

Delays were encountered from 2014 to 2015 due to funding issues, with then Pres. Benigno Aquino III gave the DND the authority to enter into multi-year contracts (MYC), while also approving the remainder of the project list submitted in 2013 by the Armed Forces of the Philippines under its AFP Modernization Program Horizon 1 Phase (2013-2017), which includes the Frigate Acquisition Project.

=== Second stage bidding ===
A new Supplemental Bid Bulletin for the project's Lot 1 second-stage bidding was released by the DND in February 2016, with an updated technical specifications provided for the proponents to follow and the schedule for the Submission of Bids and Opening of Envelopes (SOBE). The updated specifications were understood to be more detailed, and included improved features over the initial technical specifications provided during the first stage bidding. The ABC was also increased to Php 16 billion (around US$355 million) to cover for the peso's declining value over the US dollar, and to allow the improvements of the ships' key features.

Of the six proponents that passed the first stage bidding phase on 17 March 2016, only four submitted their bids for the second stage bidding phase: South Korea's HHI and DSME, Spain's Navantia SA, and India's GRSE. STX Offshore & Shipbuilding Co.'s bid submission was rejected after submitting beyond the deadline, while STX France SA did not submit a bid.

Of the four bids, only the bids of GRSE and HHI were deemed compliant, while DSME and Navantia's bids were disqualified for failing to meet documentation requirements. No Motion for Reconsideration were submitted by the two disqualified shipbuilders. Also, the DND Bids and Awards Committee confirmed GRSE, which offered a platform based on their Kamorta-class large ASW corvette design with a bid value of Php 15.047 billion, as the lowest bidder. HHI, which offered their HDF-3000-based frigate design with a bid value of Php 15.744 billion, was named as the second lowest bidder.

=== Post-bid qualification and contract awarding ===
As part of the procurement process, the lowest bidder will undergo a post-qualification inspection wherein members of the bids and awards committee and the project management team will conduct inspections at the proponent's office and shipbuilders, and confirm the submissions provided including their account books.

The joint DND-PN team conducted the post-bid qualification inspection of GRSE in June 2016, wherein they found that it did not meet financial requirements, specifically the Net Financial Contracting Capacity (NFCC), which gave the DND-PN team a reason to conduct a post-bid qualification inspection with the second lowest bidder, HHI. This was done and completed in July 2016, wherein the team found that HHI was able to comply with the requirements and was considered the Lowest Post-Qualified Bidder while declaring GRSE as Post-Disqualified.

A Notice of Award with the amount of Php 15,744,571,584.00 (around US$336.912 million) was released by the DND and awarded to HHI in August 2016, which initiated contract negotiations between the DND-PN and with HHI from September to October 2016.

On 24 October 2016, the contract to supply two brand new general purpose stealth frigates was signed between the Department of National Defense, represented by Defense Sec. Delfin Lorenzana, and Hyundai Heavy Industries, represented by its Senior Vice President Mr. Ki Sun Chung, under the presence of officials from the DND, AFP, PN, HHI, and the South Korean Ambassador to the Philippines. On the same day, HHI released a computer generated image of the frigate in their website, and released information about the dimensions of the ships.

On 30 April 2018, the HHI officially started the process for construction of the first frigate according to Navy spokesperson, Capt. Lued Lincuna. Lincuna said TIAC's acceptance of the CDR marks a significant step forward and a milestone for the project, which consists of the approval of 71 critical detailed design drawings as submitted by HHI. On 16 September 2018, HHI had started the steel cutting of the second frigate before the start of keel laying of the first frigate.

== Sensors and weapon systems ==
Based on HHI's offer on the Bill of Quantities (BOQ) Materials List on the Submission of Bids and Envelopes (SOBE) during the 2nd Stage Bidding, there were two options provided for most sensors and weapon systems. Out of the options, the Philippine Navy's Technical Working Group for the project chose the following:

- Thales TACTICOS Baseline 2 Combat Management System (CMS)
- Thales NS-106 Active Electronically Scanned Array S-band Radar
- Thales TS82521 Identification Friend or Foe (IFF) System
- Thales STIR Mk 1.2 Fire Control Radar
- Thales Bluewatcher Hull Mounted Sonar
- Thales Link Y Mk 2 Tactical Data Link
- Thales Vigile LW Electronic Support Measure (ESM), upgraded to Thales Vigile 100
- Terma C-Guard countermeasures system
- Safran Paseo NS Electro-Optical Tracking System (EOTS)
- MSI DS30 mm RCWS as secondary weapon
- L3 MAPPS Integrated Platform Management System

But after securing the contract, the sensors and weapon systems later then changed to a different configuration, using the following:

- Hanwha Systems Naval Shield Baseline 2 Integrated CMS
- Hensoldt TRS-3D Baseline D multi-mode phased array C-band Radar
- Hensoldt MSSR 2000I Identification Friend or Foe (IFF) System
- Leonardo Selex ES NA-25X Fire Control Radar
- Harris Corporation Model 997 medium frequency active/passive ASW hull mounted sonar
- Hanwha Systems Link P Tactical Data Link (derived from Link K)
- Elbit Systems Elisra NS9300A Electronic Support Measure (ESM)
- Terma C-Guard countermeasure system (retained)
- Safran PASEO NS Electro-Optical Tracking System (EOTS)(retained)
- Aselsan SMASH 30mm RCWS as secondary weapon
- Servowatch Integrated Platform Management System

Aside from the options, Hyundai and the Philippine Navy agreed to use the following weapon systems based on the specifications provided by the DND, the frigates will be armed and have provisions for the following:

- a primary 76 mm gun with 120 rounds/minute capability; Oto Melara Super Rapid 76 mm main gun.
- a secondary gun between 30 40 mm caliber, on a remote stabilized mount; Aselsan SMASH 30 mm RCWS as secondary weapon
- at least four anti-ship missile systems with a minimum range of 150 kilometers and a minimum speed of Mach 0.8; LIGNex1 SSM-700K C-Star anti-ship surface-to-surface missiles.
- two twin launchers for anti-aircraft missiles, with a minimum range of 6 kilometers, with IR or semi-active homing seeker; MBDA Mistral missiles on MBDA Simbad-RC VSHORAD launchers
- two triple trainable lightweight torpedo launchers with torpedoes, with a minimum range of 2,000 meters, with active, passive, or mixed homing guidance and an operating depth between 10 and 600 meters deep; J+S/SEA Ltd. TLS-TT Shipboard Torpedo Launching System; LIGNex1 K745 Blue Shark torpedoes
- four heavy machine guns; S&T Motiv 12.7 mm K6 Heavy Machine Guns
- for a Close-in weapon system (CIWS) (FFBNW)
- for an 8-cell Vertical Launch System (VLS) (FFBNW)
- for a Towed Array Sonar System (TASS) (FFBNW)

== Construction ==
=== BRP Jose Rizal timeline ===
On 1 May 2018, the steel cutting ceremony was held for P159 (project number of first of two frigates) at HHI shipyard in Ulsan, South Korea, marking the first step of the ship's construction journey.

On 16 October 2018, HHI held the keel laying ceremony for P159 at HHI shipyard, marking the formal start of the construction of the ship.

On 20 December 2018, Lorenzana announced at a press conference the names of the two future frigates being built by HHI: BRP Jose Rizal and BRP Antonio Luna.

On 23 May 2019, HHI launched the first ship, the prospective BRP Jose Rizal, at HHI shipyard. In the press briefing the same day, a Hanwha official said that Link 16 will likely not be compatible for the frigates until 2020 because of issues between US and South Korea.

From November 2019 to February 2020, HHI held six sea trials. All of which the Technical Inspection and Acceptance Committee reported "generally satisfactory" results.

While en route home, the ship transported 20,000 protective masks, 180 barrels of disinfectant solution, 2,000 bottles of hand sanitizer, and 300 packs of disinfectant wipes donated from the South Korean government to aid the Philippines against the COVID-19 pandemic. The donation is said to be part of South Korea's campaign to assist countries that have aided South Korea during the Korean War. On 23 May 2020, the ship arrived in Subic Bay in the Philippines after a five-day sail from South Korea.

The commissioning was delayed after one of the ship's 65-crew tested positive for COVID-19 amidst the pandemic. On 10 July 2020, the ship was eventually commissioned into service making the name BRP Jose Rizal (FF-150) official.

=== BRP Antonio Luna timeline ===
On 17 September 2018, the steel cutting ceremony was held for P160 (project number of second of two frigates) at HHI shipyard at the Shin Hwa Tech facility in Pohang City, South Korea, marking the first step of the ship's construction journey.

On 23 May 2019, HHI held the keel laying ceremony for P160 at HHI shipyard, marking the formal start of the construction of the ship.

On 8 November 2019, HHI launched the second ship, the prospective BRP Antonio Luna, at Ulsan shipyard in South Korea.

The ship's outfitting, sea trials and delivery were affected by restrictions due to the COVID-19 pandemic. HHI conducted sea trials to test the ship's seaworthiness, propulsion, communications, weapons and sensor systems.

On 18 December 2020, the Technical Inspection and Acceptance Committee declared that the ship is compliant with the agreed technical specifications after witnessing its performance during the sea trials.

On 9 February 2021, the ship was met by BRP Jose Rizal and three FA-50 jets in the vicinity of Capones Island, Zambales having departed South Korea four days prior.

On 19 March 2021, the BRP Antonio Luna officially entered service with the Philippine Navy. The ceremony happened at 8 o`clock in the morning at Pier 13, South Harbor, Manila. It was attended by Philippine Defense Secretary Delfin Lorenzana, South Korean ambassador to the Philippines Han Dong-Man and Philippine Navy chief Vice Admiral Giovanni Bacordo.

== Controversy ==
Issues arose over the decision made by HHI without approval by the Philippine Navy to use the Alternative Configuration in the selection of systems to be installed. Of particular concern were the radar and combat management system which were downgraded versions of the systems originally proposed. It was later revealed that the Contract was later changed to allow HHI final say over what equipment was installed on the vessels. No information is available on who authorized the change.

In January 2017, Special Assistant to the President Sec. Bong Go gave Defense Sec. Delfin Lorenzana a white paper endorsing Hanwha Systems which favors their Naval Shield Combat Management System (CMS) to be installed in the warships. Sec. Go's office also asked then Frigate Project Technical Working Group (TWG) Chairman Commodore Robert Empedrad, to attend a meeting in Malacañang to discuss the selection of the CMS. Empedrad would later submit a written report addressed to Pres. Rodrigo Duterte and Office of the Special Assistant to the President Sec. Bong Go

Sec. Bong Go issued a blanket denial when reached for comment, saying he never intervened in the project despite a copy/photo of the white paper being leaked online. He said he did not give Sec. Lorenzana any white paper related to the project nor asked Commodore Empedrad to brief him on the CMS selection. This was said by Sec. Go despite his Office of the Special Assistant to the President Undersecretary Lloyd Christopher Lao confirming that he forwarded the leaked letter to Sec. Lorenzana.

The DND announced that it is welcoming any investigation on the project, noting that it has nothing to hide regarding the matter. DND public affairs office chief Arsenio Andolong made the statement in response to plans of the Senate minority bloc to conduct an investigation on the Frigate Acquisition Project (FAP).

Another issue was on the question of HHI's qualification to build the frigates, as HHI was banned from participating in any South Korean tenders for two years. A case stemmed in 2013, after its top executive was found guilty of offering bribes in order to win the bid to supply parts for four nuclear reactors to be constructed at the United Arab Emirates. In 2015, HHI was convicted and was penalized by a two-year ban. It sought to have the ban nullified in 2015, but the South Korean Supreme Court ruled with finality against the shipbuilder on 22 December 2017.

The commander of the Philippine Navy, Vice Adm. Ronald Mercado was removed from his position for "insubordination" after Defense Sec. Delfin Lorenzana declared that he jeopardized the acquisition project.

Mercado was unceremoniously replaced by Rear Adm. Robert Empedrad over the controversial P18-billion frigate acquisition project with South Korea's shipbuilder Hyundai Heavy Industries.

The fallout would put Go's influence and Lao's actions under scrutiny, causing the relief of a career naval officer, VAdm. Mercado. President Duterte would extend himself and defend Go from the issue. Go offered to resign, but Duterte refused this. VAdm. Mercado would later defend Go and say he never had any discussion with Go over Hanwha or the FAP.

== Ships in class ==
Name	Hull number	Builder	Laid down	Launched	Delivered	Commissioned	Status
BRP Jose Rizal	FFG-14	Hyundai Heavy Industries	16 October 2018	23 May 2019	23 May 2020	10 July 2020	Active
BRP Antonio Luna	FFG-15	Hyundai Heavy Industries	23 May 2019	8 November 2019	9 February 2021	19 March 2021	Active

== Upgrades ==
On January 12, 2026, the Department of National Defense Bids & Awards Committee have published a list of active bid requirements which included the upgrade of the Rizal-class with the Close-In Weapon System (CIWS) and Towed-Array Sonar System (TASS). The specific item indicated in the publication was "Frigate Weapons and Sensors System Upgrade Project (Installation and integration of the Closed-In Weapon Systems and Towed Array Sonar Systems for the JRCF". The project is a direct contracting with HD Hyundai Heavy Industries worth PHP 5.349 billion. The ships of the Jose Rizal-class were delivered "fitted-for-but-not-with" (FFBNW) close-in weapons and towed-array sonar systems.
