= Battle of Hill 488 =

Part of the Vietnam War (1966)

- Part of Operation Kansas, Vietnam War
| Date | 15–16 June 1966 |
| Location | Hiệp Đức District, Quảng Nam Province South Vietnam 15.34°N 108.29°E |
| Result | American victory |

Belligerents
| United States | Viet Cong; North Vietnam |

Commanders and leaders
| (United States) Jimmie E. Howard | |

Units involved
| 1st Reconnaissance Battalion; 1st Battalion, 5th Marines | |

Strength
| 1st Recon: 18; 1/5 Marines: ~250 | US Estimate: ~250–300 |

Casualties and losses
| 14 killed | ~42–200 casualties |
- Location within Vietnam

The Battle of Hill 488 was a military engagement of the Vietnam War that took place on the night of 15–16 June 1966. A small United States Marine Corps (USMC) reconnaissance platoon inflicted large casualties on regular People's Army of Vietnam (PAVN) and Viet Cong (VC) fighters before withdrawing with only a few dead.

== Background ==
In June 1966, the 1st Marine Division began expanding its Tactical Area of Responsibility north into Quảng Tín Province (today part of Quảng Nam Province). In order to interdict enemy fighters between Tam Kỳ and the Hiệp Đức District, Brigadier General William A. Stiles conceived of an extensive reconnaissance effort in the area. Dubbed Operation Kansas, the initial phase was to find the headquarters of the PAVN 2nd Division near the Quế Sơn Valley, then exploit that in the second phase by engaging with eight battalions of Marine and Army of the Republic of Vietnam (ARVN) infantry.

On the afternoon and evening of the 13th, seven teams from 1st Reconnaissance Battalion were deployed in the area around Núi Lộc Sơn and Quế Sơn, ringing the valley. They were tasked to report on enemy activity via AN/PRC-25 radio, and to call in artillery fire and airstrikes. While most of the teams successfully avoided detection, a scout dog accompanying an enemy patrol caught scent of one team near Hill 555. As the patrol advanced towards their position, the team hastily retreated and were exfiltrated by helicopter to Chu Lai.

Team 2 was deployed at dusk on 13 June, a platoon of 16 Marines and 2 attached corpsmen, under the leadership of Staff Sergeant Jimmie E. Howard. They were dropped off near the top of Hill 488, known to locals as Nui Vu, near Hiệp Đức. Settling into static positions atop the 488 metres (1,601 ft) hill, they established a defensive perimeter around the poorly-covered and -concealed hilltop to establish their observation post. By constant observation over the next few days, the team was able to monitor many enemy patrols and troop movements, and successfully called in artillery fire from a nearby artillery battery about 4 1/2 miles (7.2 km) to the south. Though they became concerned that the enemy might conclude they were being observed, Howard decided against exfiltration on the evening of the 14th. Requesting permission from the battalion commander, Lieutenant Colonel Arthur Sullivan, to remain in the area for one more day, he cited a good escape route to the east, and his request was granted.

== Battle ==
On the 14th, the PAVN began organizing a force to attack the post. On the night of the 15th, a nearby Army Special Forces team leading a Civilian Irregular Defense Group patrol radioed warning that a full battalion of about 200 to 250 PAVN and VC were closing in. At 22:00 that night, Lance Corporal Ricardo C. Binns fired the first shots from his M14 rifle. The PAVN/VC quickly surrounded the Marines and advanced in too close for fire support to assist. DShK and 60mm mortar fire kept the Marines from maneuvering out of their hilltop positions. After the initial contact, the Marines withdrew from their outposts to the main position near a rocky knoll, and the PAVN/VC responded with a shower of hand grenades and a short assault that was repelled. Switching to more cautious tactics, the PAVN/VC began quietly probing the Marine's lines for weaknesses, being rebuffed violently each time, forcing them to withdraw long enough to regroup. Near midnight, Howard radioed his company commander, Captain Tim Geraghty, to ask for extraction and close air support, but these were delayed at III Marine Amphibious Force's (III MAF) Direct Air Support Center.

After fending off another coordinated assault, the Marines were low on ammunition, and all of them had been wounded by that point. While the frustrated pilots circled the area without being able to see clear targets, a C-47 deployed flares for illumination at around 01:00. Early into the morning, as Marines traded taunts with the enemy, the pilots began dangerously close attack missions, including one Air Force F-105, Marine F8U Crusaders, and helicopter gunships. Armed UH-1Es stayed with the Marines through the morning until the end of the battle, often serving as airborne forward air controllers with the aid of Howard and his red-filtered flashlight.

As the PAVN/VC launched their third assault, Howard forbade the use of automatic fire to conserve ammunition. Out of grenades, the Marines threw rocks in the hopes that the enemy would confuse them for live explosives. A pair of UH-34 Choctaws attempted to land at about 03:00, but were driven off by heavy fire. By 04:00, six of the eighteen Americans had been killed, and Howard was immobilized by a wound to his back, using Binns to relay commands to the platoon while he called in air strikes. The PAVN/VC ceased offensive tactics and dug into cover (as daylight made them vulnerable to unassisted air attack), but kept the Marines trapped on the hilltop. During a lull in the fighting, Major William J. Goodsell, commanding officer of VMO-6, risked a landing to medevac the wounded, but was shot down and later died of his wounds. When a second UH-1 offered itself as bait to draw out enemy positions, it too was shot down, killing a crew chief. Two other Marines were killed of gunshot wounds in their helicopters.

Just before 10:00, Company C, 1st Battalion, 5th Marines arrived on the south face in UH-34s. While the reconnaissance team was evacuated immediately, the infantry company remained for a few hours to finish the fight. After brief resistance, the PAVN/VC retreated in the face of the reinforcements, leaving forty-two of their dead behind.

== Aftermath ==
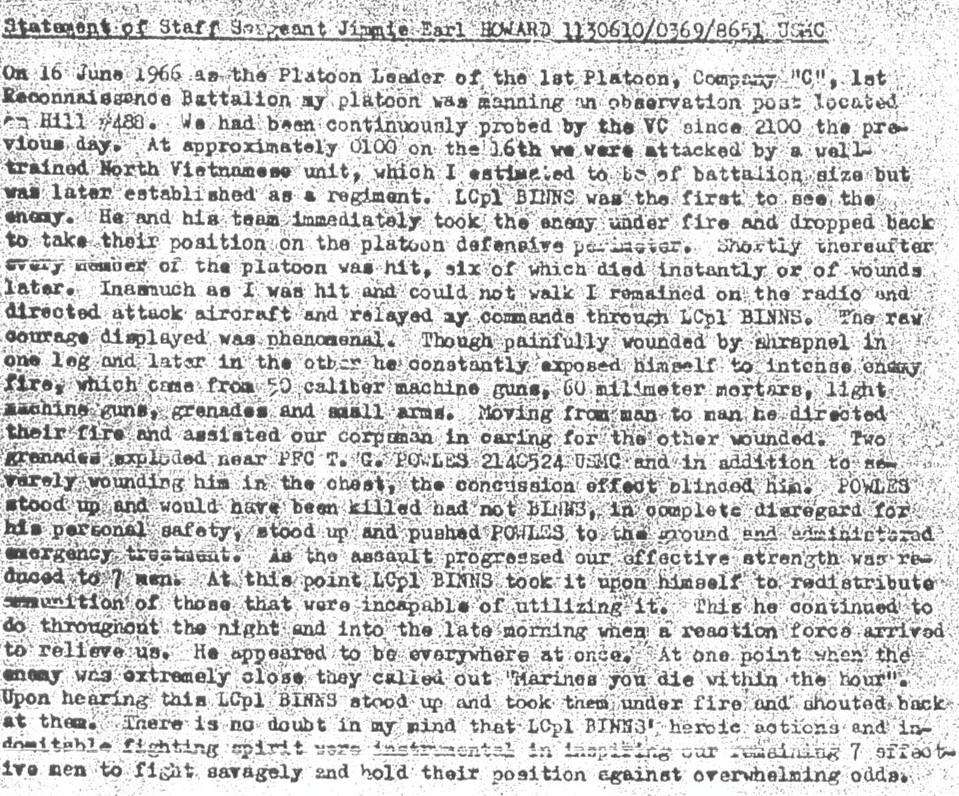
Statement by Jimmie E. Howard

After both sides had retreated, the battle had lasted approximately twelve hours of vicious fighting, some hand-to-hand. The marines of Team 2 lost six men, Company C lost four, and the two aviation squadrons lost two Marines each, along with two UH-1Es. US claims the PAVN/VC casualties range from 42 to 100 or 200.

The first phase of Operation Kansas ended on the 16th, and the second phase of the operation was modified. The ARVN forces were unavailable due to the Buddhist Uprising at Huế, but Lieutenant General Lewis William Walt, the commander of III MAF, ordered the operation to continue. With 141 reported sightings, Marine infantry and fire support dispersed PAVN troops from the area, and the operation ended on the 22nd. The next month, Sullivan would take his battalion onto Operation Washington.

Each member of Team 2 was decorated for their actions, each also receiving the Purple Heart for their wounds. Howard was promoted to Gunnery Sergeant and received the Medal of Honor from President Lyndon B. Johnson at the White House on 21 August 1967. Commissioned in 2001, USS Howard would be named for him. Four would receive the Navy Cross: Corporal Binns, Petty Officer Second Class Billee Don Holmes, while Corporal Jerrald Thompson and Lance Corporal John Adams would be awarded posthumously. The remaining thirteen would all receive Silver Stars, four posthumously, as were two members of Company C.

The desperate nature of the fighting, often hand-to-hand, lead to comparisons with Battle of the Alamo and The Longest Day.
