= Ricardo C. Binns =

United States Marine Corps Navy Cross recipient (1945–2018)

Ricardo Courtney Binns
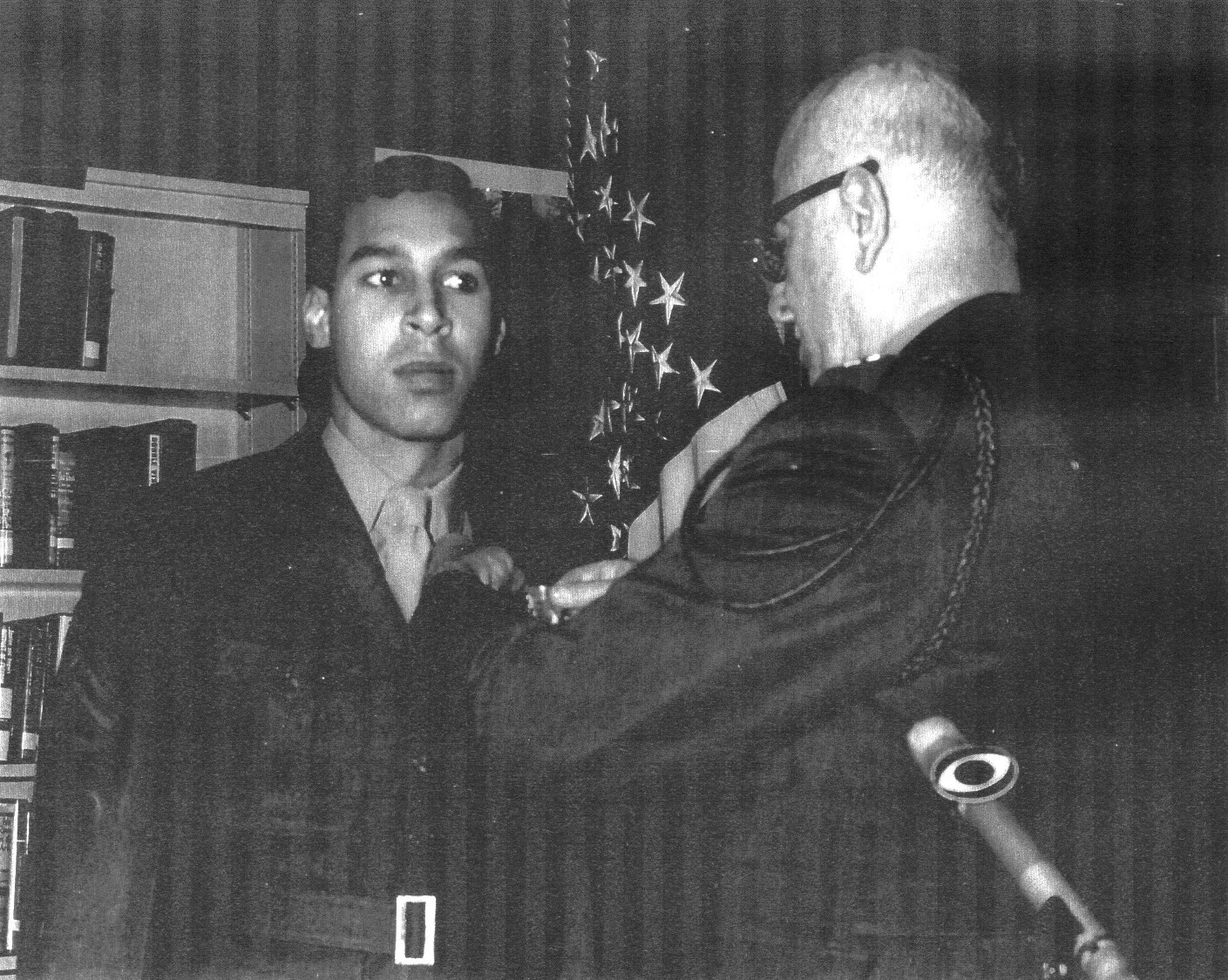
- Binns being awarded the Navy Cross
- Born: 25 December 1945; Bronx, New York, US
- Died: 10 November 2018 (aged 72); Bonners Ferry, Idaho, US
- Burial place: Buried at Sea off USS Howard
- Military career
- Allegiance: United States
- Branch: United States Marine Corps
- Service years: 1963–1971
- Rank: Corporal
- Nickname: "Ric"
- Units: 1st Battalion, 8th Marines; 2nd Battalion, 9th Marines; 1st Reconnaissance Battalion
- Conflicts: Vietnam War: Battle of Hill 488
- Awards: Navy Cross; Purple Heart (2)

Ricardo Courtney Binns (R.C.Binns) (25 December 1945 – 10 November 2018) was a corporal in the United States Marine Corps and a recipient of the Navy Cross for actions in the Battle of Hill 488 of the Vietnam War. Later in life he became an author. Using the name he was most commonly known by, R. C. Binns, he wrote "We Are Not Warmongers", and The Price of Glory: "Battle of Hill 488".

== Biography ==
Binns was born in The Bronx, New York on 25 December 1945. In 1963, he enlisted in the Marine Corps and attended recruit training at Marine Corps Recruit Depot Parris Island. He was subsequently trained in an infantry specialty as an anti-tank assaultman, assigned the Military Occupational Specialty code of 0351. He was then assigned to 1st Battalion, 8th Marines at Marine Corps Base Camp Lejeune until he volunteered for duty in the Vietnam War. There, he served with a military police unit until assigned to 2nd Battalion, 9th Marines. He was reassigned to Company C of 1st Reconnaissance Battalion after volunteering for training as a reconnaissanceman and was awarded a meritorious promotion to lance corporal.

On the evening of 13 June 1966, Binns's platoon of 18, under the leadership of then-Staff Sergeant Jimmie E. Howard were dropped behind enemy lines atop Hill 488, known to locals as Nui Vu, near Chu Lai and Tam Kỳ, with a mission to observe enemy troop movements in the Hiệp Đức Valley, and call in artillery and airstrikes. Within two days, the North Vietnamese Army detected the observation post and descended on them in force. On the night of the 15th, a nearby Army Special Forces team radioed warning that a full battalion of about 200 to 250 regulars and several Viet Cong were closing in. At 2200 that night, Binns fired the first shots from his M14 rifle, and the enemy soon engaged the Marines too close for their fire support to assist, though a C-47 did deploy flares for illumination. Binns exposed himself numerous times to recover wounded personnel despite his own wounds, as he was distributing ammunition and taking charge when Howard was wounded or busy on the radio. Late into the night of the 15th, as Marines traded taunts with the enemy, desperate pilots began dangerously close close air support missions By dawn on the 16th, the beleaguered platoon held their position, killing approximately 200 enemies at a cost of 6 of the platoon in the 12 hours of intense fighting. Binns was one of four Navy Cross recipients during the battle, while Howard would be awarded the Medal of Honor and the remaining thirteen received Silver Stars.

Wounded in the battle, Binns refused assistance once a company from 1st Battalion, 5th Marines arrived to relieve the Marines. Awarded his second Purple Heart, he was unable to fully recover, placed on a temporary retirement list and eventually medically discharged in 1971. In 2010 and 2011, a recommendation that Binns' Navy Cross be upgraded to the Medal of Honor was submitted to multiple Congressmen in Idaho, where he resided at the time. The recommendation was denied by the Marine Corps in 2014. Ricardo Binns died in his home in Boundary County, Idaho, on 10 November 2018.

== Navy Cross Citation ==
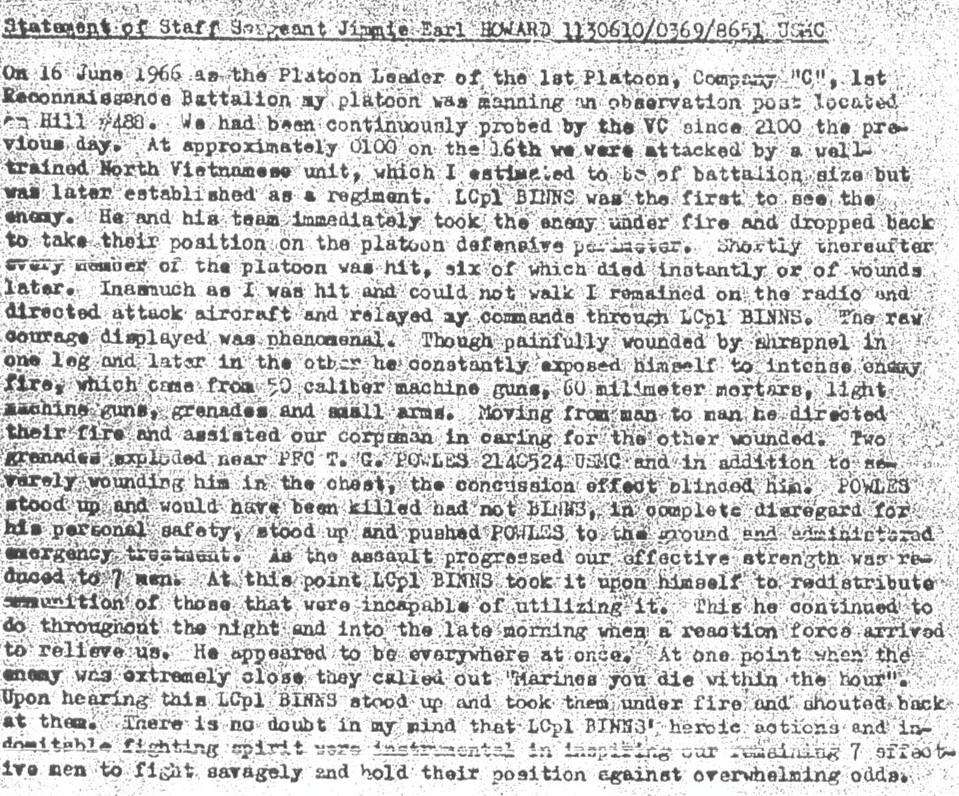
Statement by Jimmie E. Howard on Binns's actions

The President of the United States
Takes Pleasure in Presenting The Navy Cross To

Corporal Ricardo C. Binns

United States Marine Corps

for service as set forth in the following citation:

The President of the United States of America takes pleasure in presenting the Navy Cross to Corporal [then Lance Corporal] Ricardo C. Binns, United States Marine Corps, for extraordinary heroism as a Scout Team Leader, Company C, First Force Reconnaissance Battalion, First Marine Division (Reinforced), Fleet Marine Force, in the Republic of Vietnam on the night of 15–16 June 1966. Corporal Binns' platoon established an observation post deep within communist controlled territory to observe enemy movement. At 0100 a massive assault was launched against the Marine position by a determined and well-trained North Vietnamese battalion. The murderous enemy fire was so intense that five of the eighteen-man platoon were killed and the remainder wounded. On two separate occasions, with complete disregard for his personal safety, Corporal Binns braved the withering enemy fire to forcibly pull to the ground severely wounded Marines who had unconsciously exposed themselves to almost certain death. Realizing that his Platoon Leader was wounded and unable to move, and preoccupied with the direction of close support aircraft, Corporal Binns took it upon himself to direct the fire of the remaining seven Marines, redistribute the ammunition of those who could not use it, and care for the wounded. Although painfully wounded in both legs, Corporal Binns displayed magnificent courage throughout the night and long into the following morning. His selfless devotion to duty, superb professional skill, deep concern for his fellow Marines, and extraordinary heroism inspired all who observed him and were in keeping with the highest traditions of the Marine Corps and of the United States Naval Service.

== See also ==
- List of Navy Cross recipients for the Vietnam War
