= MV Faina =

Scrapped container ship

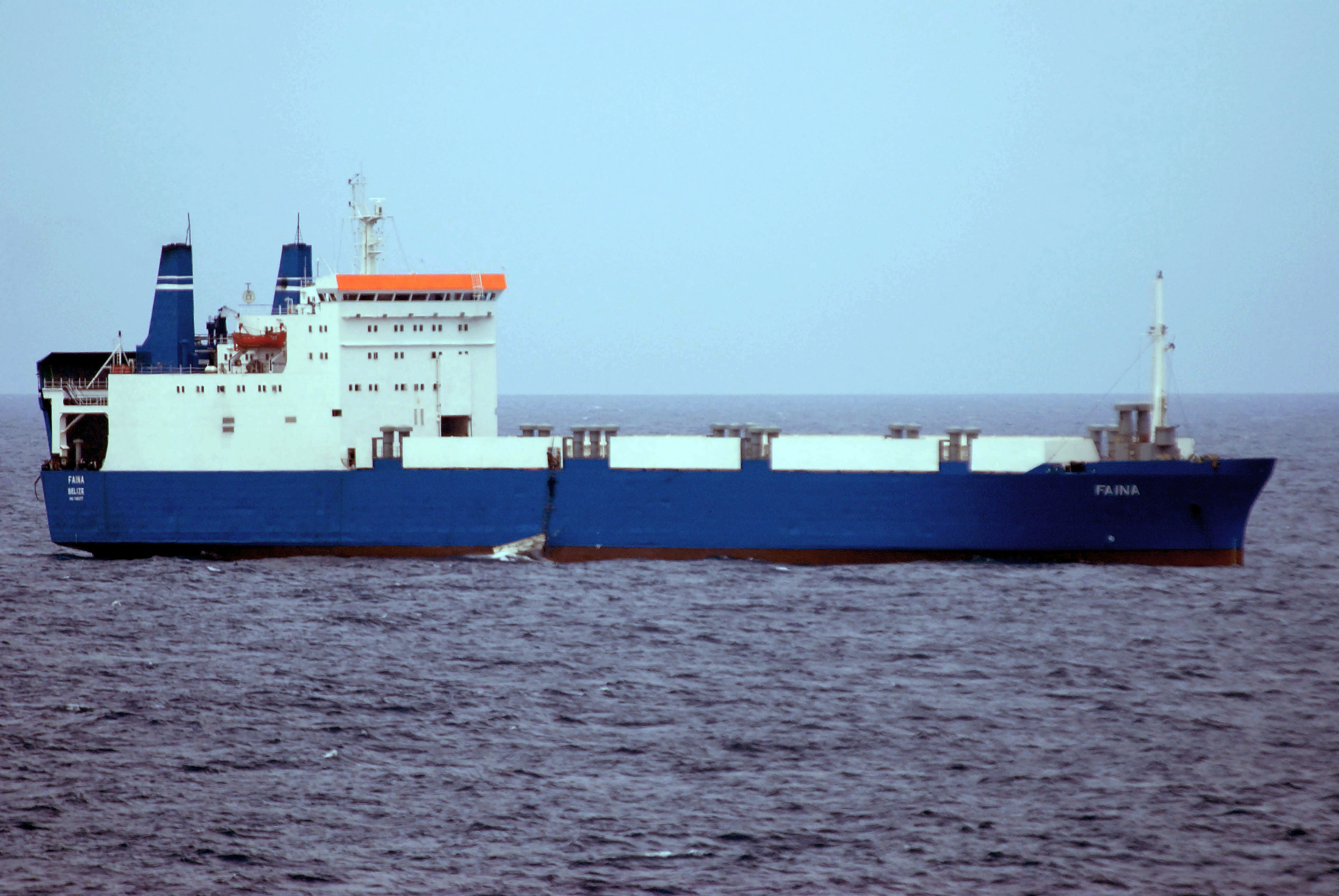
- MV Faina as observed from the guided-missile cruiser USS Vella Gulf.

History
- Name: 1978: Vallmo; 1983: Matina; 1985: Loverval; 2003: Marabou; 2007: Faina
- Owner: Waterlux AG
- Operator: Tomex Team
- Port of registry: 1978: Sweden; 1991: Luxembourg; 1996: Panama; (unknown): Belize
- Builder: Lödöse Varv AB
- Yard number: 179
- Launched: 21 December 1977
- Completed: May 1978
- Identification: IMO number: 7419377
- Fate: Scrapped in Chittagong, 6 December 2014

General characteristics
- Class & type: KM* L3
- Tonnage: 10,931 GT
- Displacement: 13,650 long tons (13,870 t)
- Length: 152.5 m (500 ft 4 in) LBP
- Beam: 18.01 m (59 ft 1 in) (moulded)
- Draught: 6.72 m (22.0 ft)
- Depth: 13.35 m (43.8 ft)
- Propulsion: 2 × diesel engines
- Speed: 17.0 knots (31.5 km/h; 19.6 mph)
- Crew: 21

MV Faina (Ukrainian: Фаїна) was a roll-on/roll-off cargo ship operated by a Ukrainian company that sailed under a Belize flag of convenience, owned by Panama City-based Waterlux AG, and managed by Tomex Team of Odesa, Ukraine.

On 25 September 2008, the ship was captured by Somali pirates allegedly under the orders of piracy kingpin Mohamed Abdi Hassan, in the twenty-sixth such attack in 2008. The Faina's crew (at the time of capture) consisted of 17 Ukrainians, three Russians and one Latvian. On 28 September, Viktor Nikolsky, first mate on the Faina, said that Vladimir Kolobkov, the ship's Russian captain, had died from a hypertension-related stroke. On 5 February 2009 it was announced that a ransom of US $3.2 million had been paid to the pirates, and the ship was released the next day.

== Hijacking ==
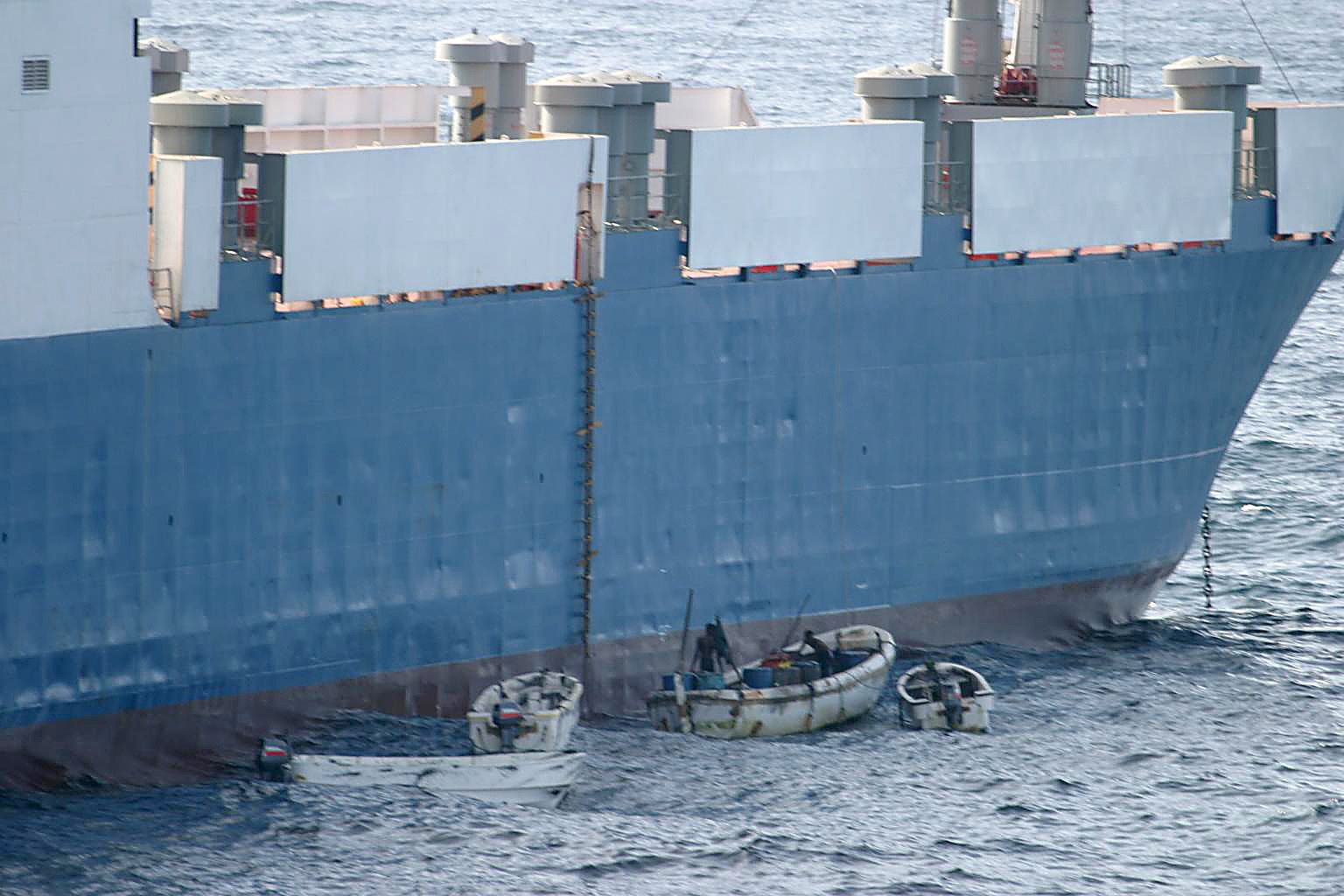
A photograph taken on board USS Howard showing Somali pirates in small boats after hijacking MV Faina.

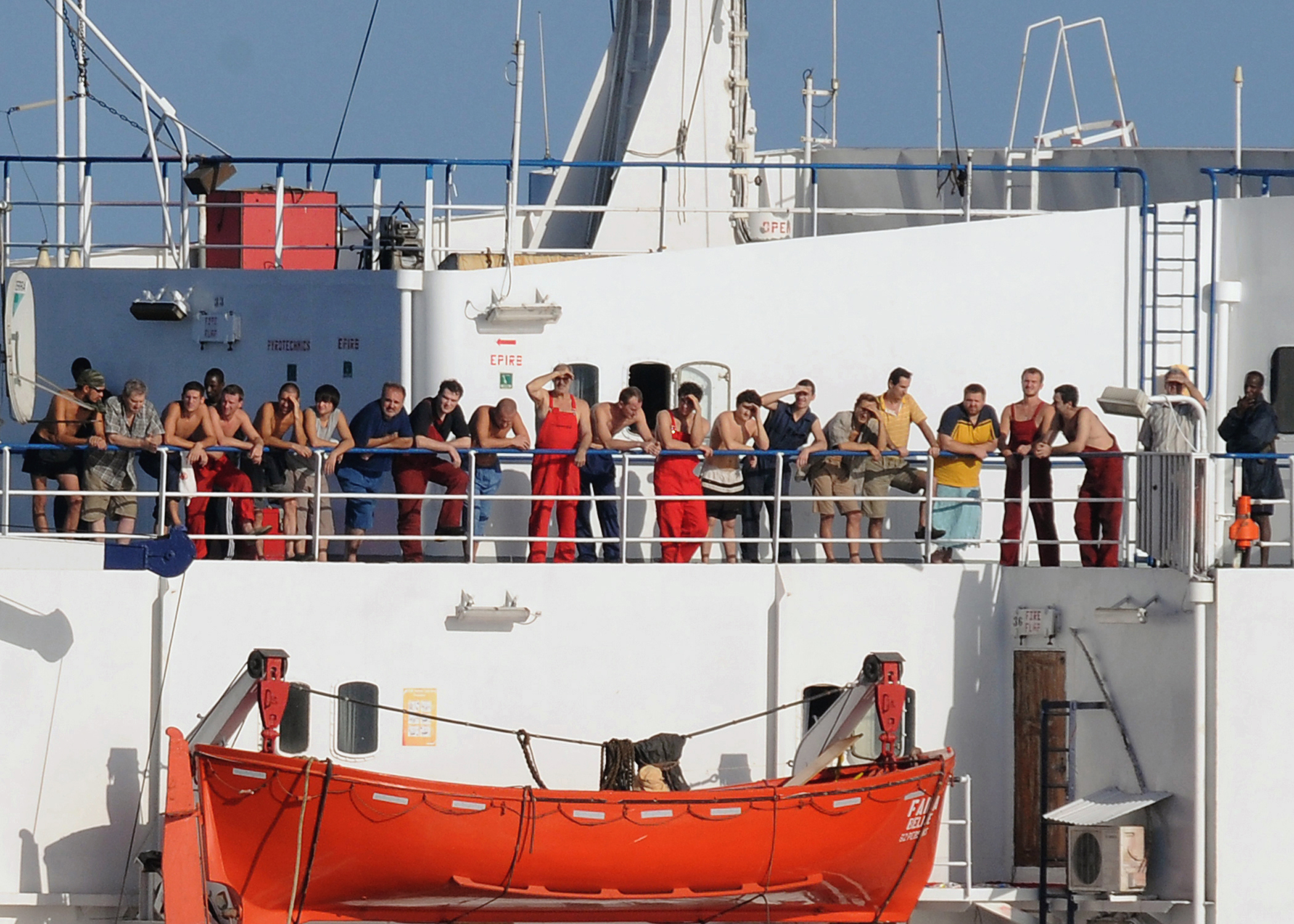
The crew of MV Faina stands on the deck after a U.S. Navy request to check on their health and welfare.

On 25 September 2008, the Faina was hijacked by approximately 50 Somali pirates calling themselves the Central Regional Coast Guard. The ship was allegedly heading to Mombasa, Kenya, from Ukraine with 33 Soviet-made T-72 tanks, weapons (including rocket-propelled grenades and anti-aircraft guns) and ammunition on board, when it was seized. The pirates said they were unaware of the ship's cargo before they captured it. However, the pirates claim that documents found on board indicate that the arms cargo was destined for Juba, Southern Sudan, instead of Kenya, as originally understood. The claim was confirmed by U.S. Navy and several other intelligence groups, although the Kenyan government denies the allegation.

The pirates demanded a ransom and had threatened to blow up the ship, along with the pirates themselves and the ship's crew, if the ransom was not paid. The ransom amount was reported as US$35 million, US$20 million, US$8 million, and US$5 million in the weeks following the capture. The threat was later withdrawn. The pirates initially set a course for the pirate haven of Eyl, but instead anchored near the village of Hinbarwaqo after the U.S. Navy's Arleigh Burke-class destroyer Howard caught up to them. Supplies of fuel for electrical generation were accepted on board, and food and drinking water were later delivered to the ship.

The Howard engaged the Faina in pursuit within several hundred yards to stop the unloading of the cargo by the pirates. Later, the Ticonderoga-class missile cruiser Vella Gulf and other U.S. warships joined the Howard and surrounded the Faina with the Russian missile frigate Neustrashimy patrolling the Somali coast.

American helicopters and other aircraft flew over the Faina. Warships from the U.S. Navy and other navies blockaded the MV Faina in a port off Somalia's Indian Ocean coast. However, pirates wanted to unload small weapons from the cargo near Hinbarwaqo, even while warned not to do so by surrounding naval ships.

Three of the hijackers were reportedly killed during a gunfight between rival pirates. This report was denied by the pirates, who said that they were celebrating Eid ul-Fitr, and were "happy on the ship" and were "celebrating", but a US defence official said that the military believed three people had been killed in the row on the ship, which has been under close surveillance.

=== International reactions ===
Russia, Somalia, Ukraine, the United Kingdom, the United States, and NATO cooperated to try to recover the ship. Kenya said that it would refuse to cooperate or negotiate with the pirates.

This incident and further hijackings renewed international efforts to stem Somali piracy. On 7 October 2008, because of the rise in hijackings—besides the Faina, some eleven other vessels were hijacked—the United Nations Security Council adopted resolution 1838, which "calls upon all states interested in the security of maritime activities to take part actively in the fight against piracy on the high seas off the coast of Somalia, in particular by deploying naval vessels and military aircraft." NATO authorized a force of frigates to patrol Somalia's waters, India fired on a pirate ship, and the coast of Somalia was to be blockaded by navies of many nations.

Puntland Minister of Fisheries Ahmed Said Aw-nur advocated storming the Faina with European or American commandos, saying, "[a] military operation has to be taken." On 1 October, Mohammed Jammer Ali, the acting Somali Foreign Minister, said, "[t]he international community has permission to fight with the pirates." The Somali insurgency group Al-Shabaab advised the pirates to "either burn down the ship and its arms or sink it" if the ransom was not paid.

=== Hostage revolt ===
On Tuesday, 9 December 2008, the pirates holding the ship and its crew hostage told the AFP that two of the hostages had unsuccessfully tried to revolt against the pirates the previous Monday. This revolt was put down shortly after, and the spokesman for the pirates reported that they would take "serious punitive measures" against the crewmembers. However, the account of the pirates concerning the revolt was disputed by Mikhail Voitenko, a writer for the Russian Sovfracht Maritime Bulletin, who called the story a "canard" and "threat" that was meant to cover for the capture by American forces of two of the pirates from the Faina who were heading for shore, and the failed bid of the pirates to convince the intermediaries and the ship owner to speak to the Americans and gain the captured pirates' release.

=== Release ===
On 5 February 2009, the MV Faina was released after being held captive for 5 months. The remaining crew of 20 were freed along with the ship and were reported by the Ukrainian presidency as being healthy and safe. A ransom of US$3,200,000 was paid on 4 February 2009 by the ship's mysterious owners. The pirates left the vessel early the next day, stating that the release had been delayed for one hour, but the ship was eventually released. The ship arrived at its destination, the Port of Mombasa, on 12 February 2009, where the cargo was unloaded.

An inquiry by the Kenyan parliamentary Defence and Foreign Relations Committee failed to determine the destination of the cargo. The chairman of the committee Adan Keynan criticised the Kenyan Ministry of Defence for non-cooperation and secret-keeping.

== Gallery ==
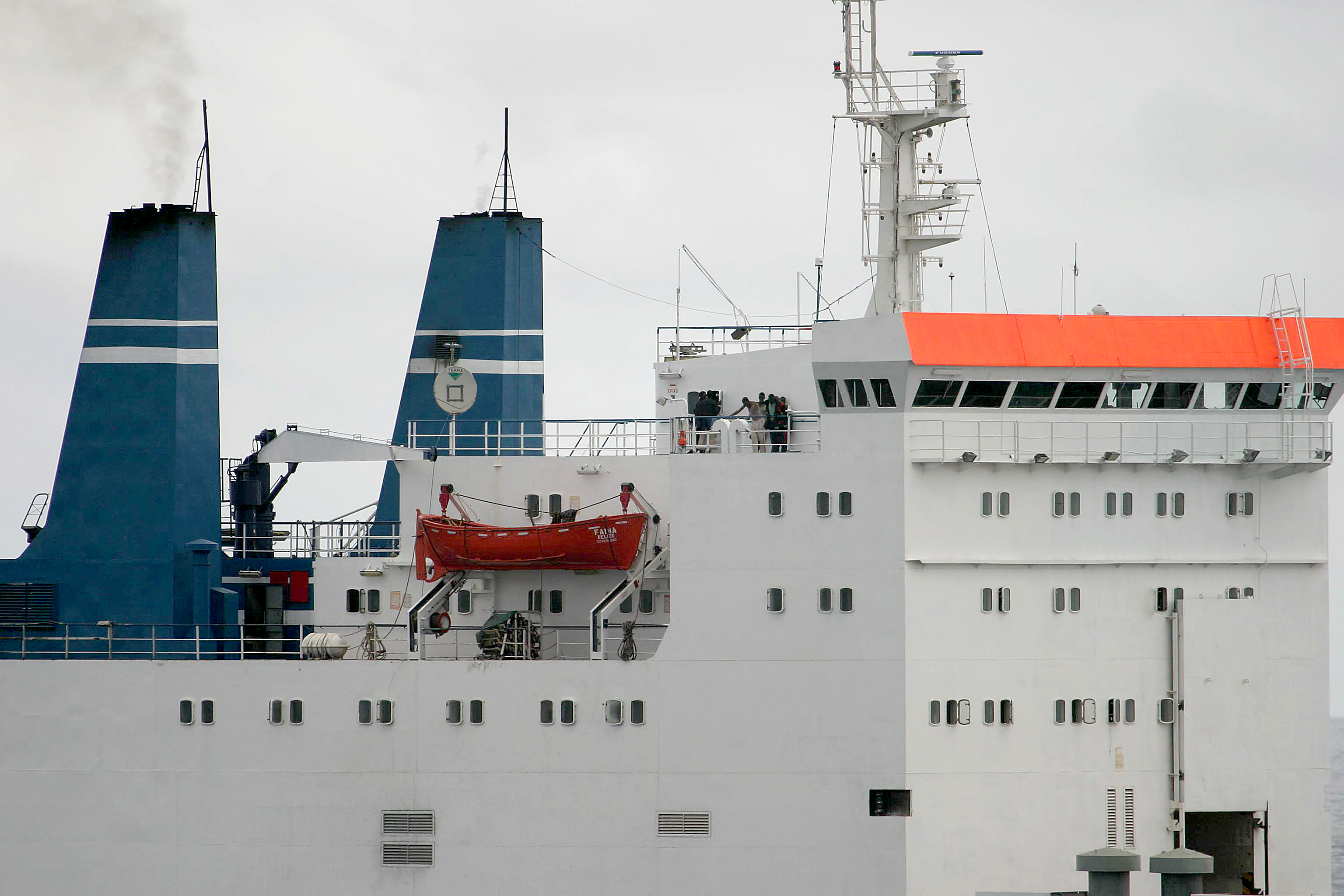

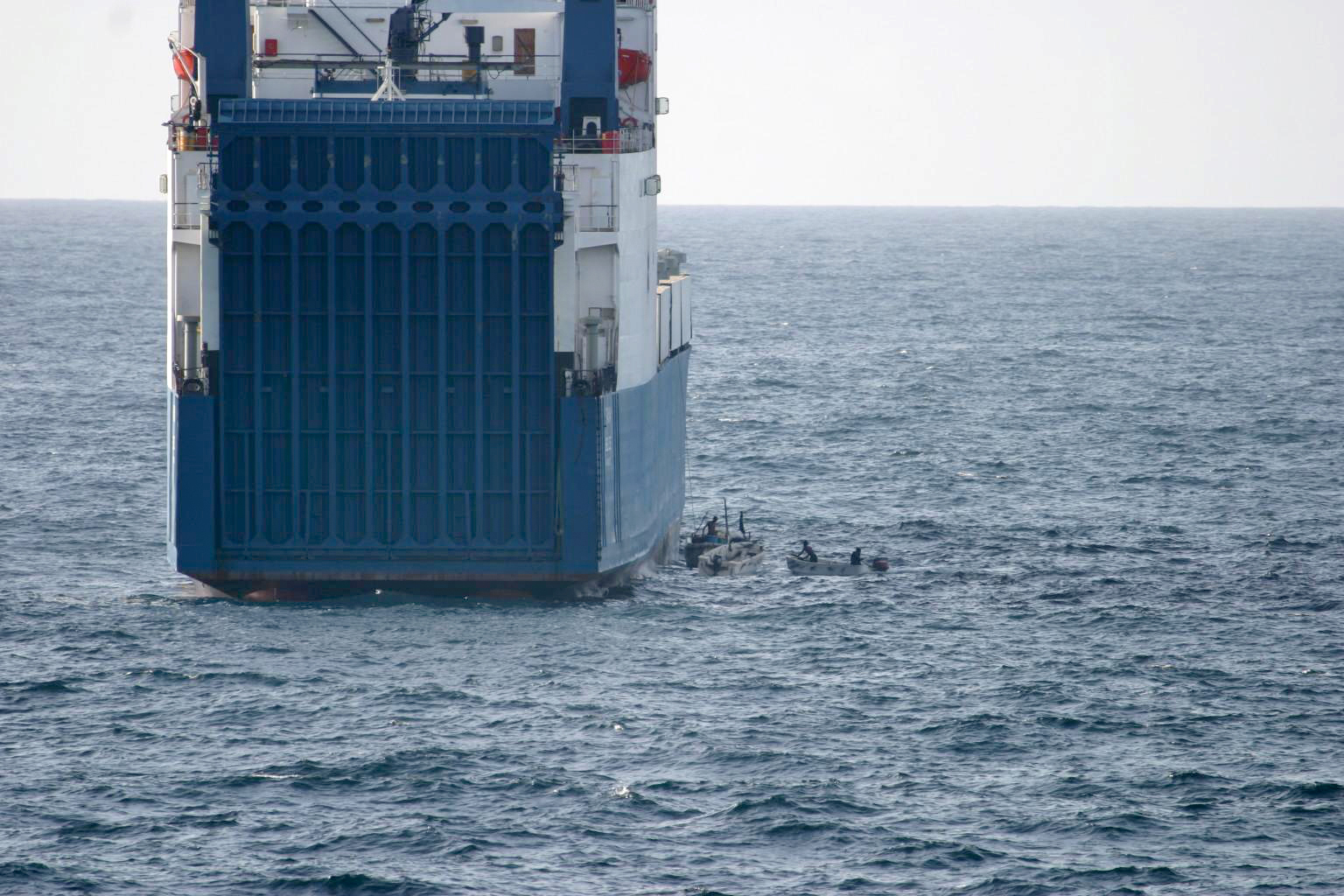

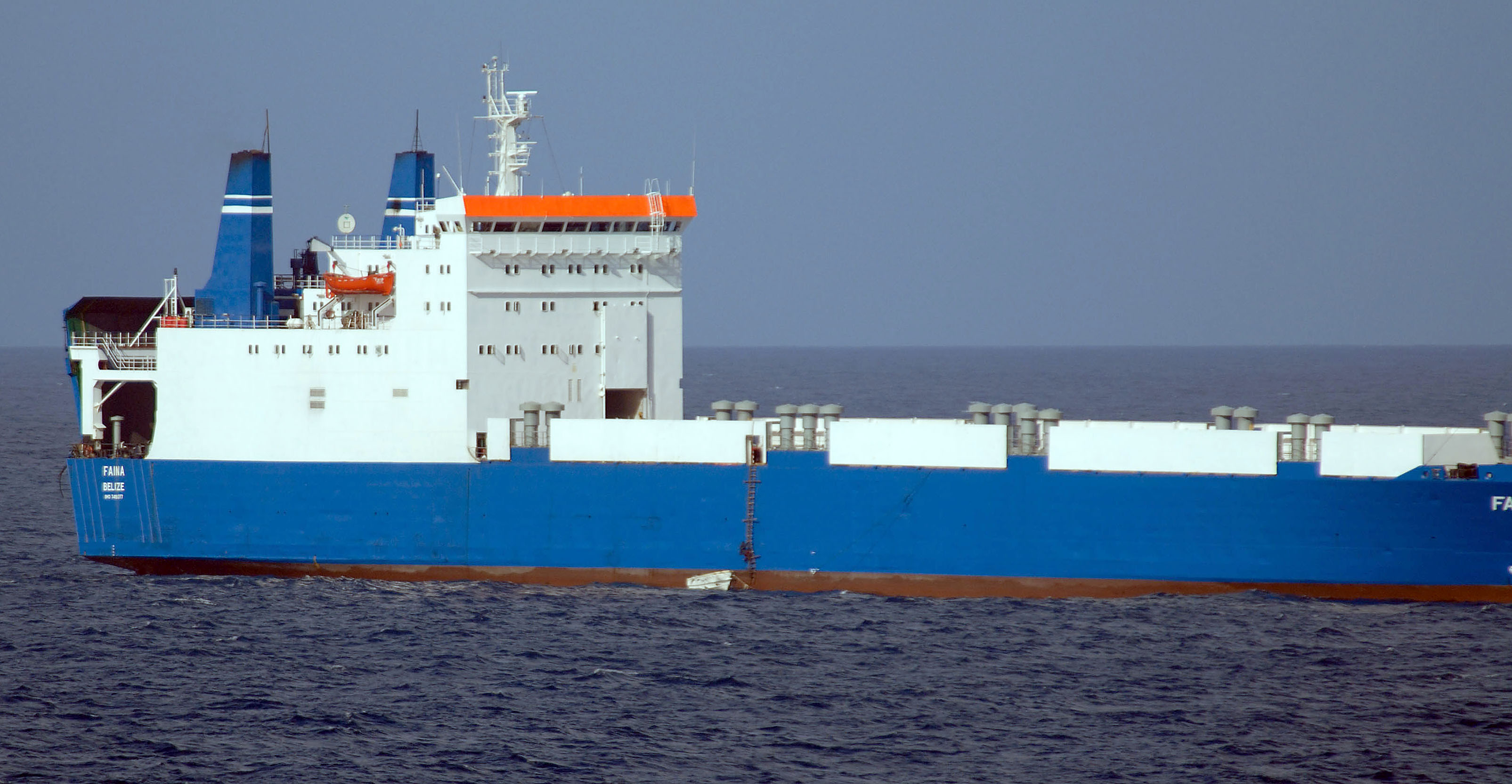

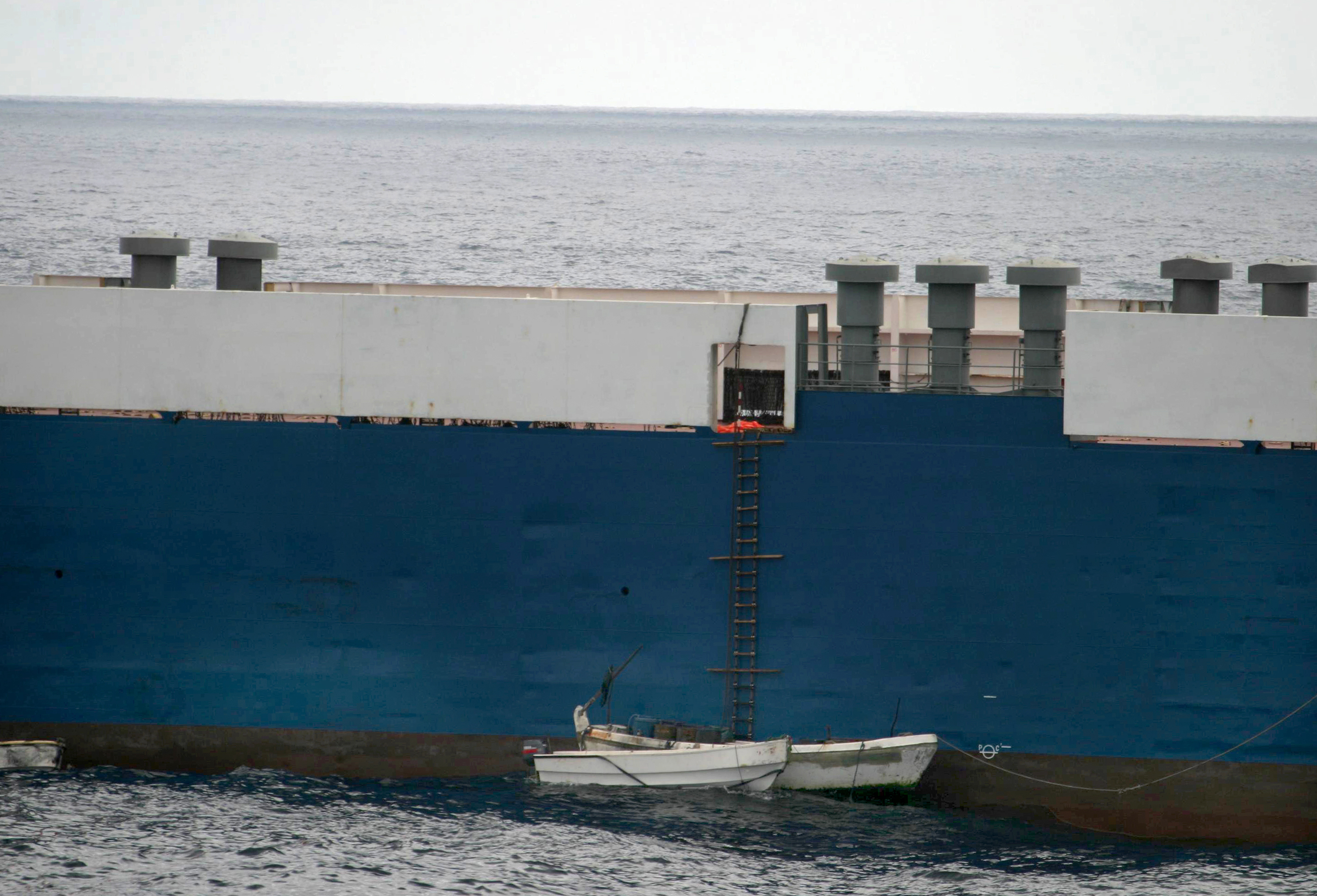

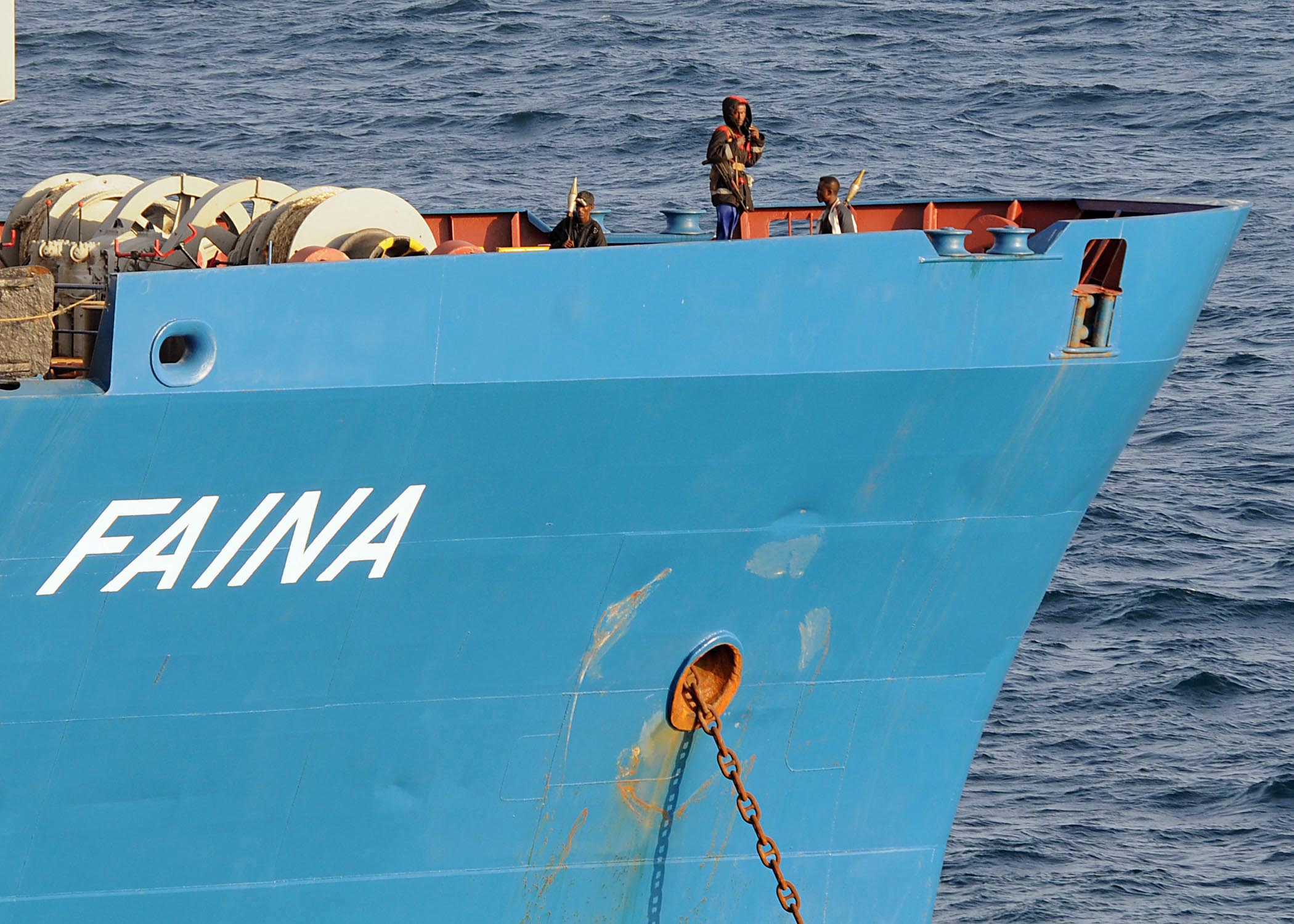
