= 1st Reconnaissance Battalion =

US Marine unit

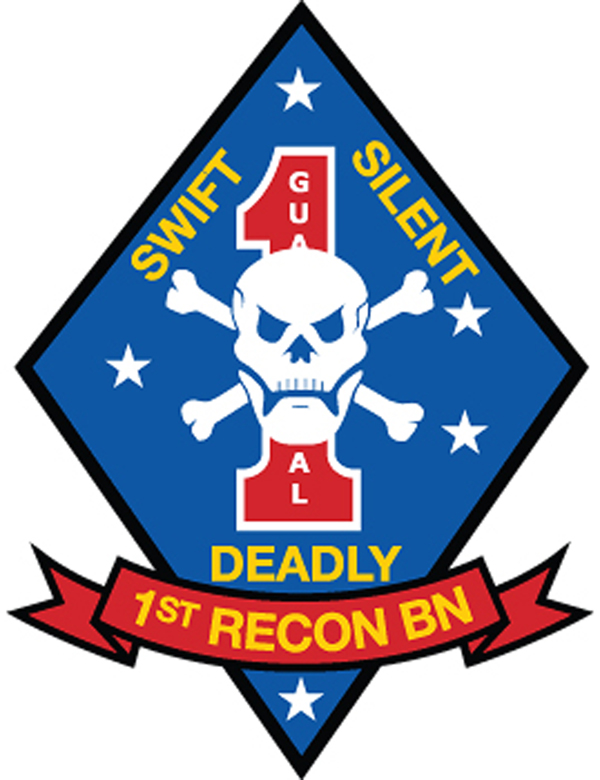
- 1st Reconnaissance Battalion insignia
- Active: March 1, 1937 – present
- Country: United States of America
- Branch: United States Marine Corps
- Type: Marine Division Recon
- Role: Direct support of Marine Air-Ground Task Force Joint Task Force: Special Reconnaissance; Deep Reconnaissance; Long-Range Reconnaissance; Unconventional Warfare; Direct Action; Visit, Board, Search, and Seizure (VBSS); Maritime Interdiction Operations (MIO)
- Part of: I Marine Expeditionary Force; 1st Marine Division; 11th Marine Expeditionary Unit
- Garrison/HQ: MCB Camp Pendleton, California
- Nickname: Black Diamonds
- Patron: LtCol William "Wild Bill" Whaling
- Mottos: "Celer, Silens, Mortalis", "Swift, Silent, Deadly"
- Colors: Black and Gold
- Engagements: World War II: Battle of Guadalcanal; Battle of Cape Gloucester; Battle of Peleliu; Battle of Okinawa; Korean War; Vietnam War; Operation Desert Storm; War on terror: Operation Iraqi Freedom; Operation Enduring Freedom
- Decorations: Presidential Unit Citation; Navy Unit Commendation; American Defense Service Medal; Asiatic-Pacific Campaign Medal; World War II Victory Medal; Navy Occupation Service Medal; China Service Medal; National Defense Service Medal; Korean Service Medal; Armed Forces Expeditionary Medal; Vietnam Service Medal; Korean Presidential Unit Citation; Vietnam Cross of Gallantry; Iraq Campaign Medal; Global War on Terrorism Expeditionary; Global War on Terrorism Service

Commanders
- Commanding Officer: LtCol D. J. Davis
- Sergeant Major: SgtMaj R. B. Johnson
- Notable commanders: William C. Chip

The 1st Reconnaissance Battalion (abbreviated as 1st Recon Bn) is a reconnaissance battalion in the United States Marine Corps. It is a stand-alone battalion with no parent regiment. Instead, it falls directly under the command of the 1st Marine Division. 1st Recon Bn is located at Marine Corps Base Camp Pendleton in San Diego, California.

The unit was founded in 1937 as the 1st Tank Company of the 1st Marine Brigade and went through several name changes before it became the 1st Reconnaissance Battalion in 1958. The battalion was deactivated on June 12, 1992, before being restored as the Reconnaissance Company of the 1st Marine Division's Headquarters and Service Battalion on October 1, 1993. The 1st Recon Battalion was reactivated on July 5, 2000, as part of Marine Corps Commandant General James L. Jones' mission to revitalize Marine Corps reconnaissance.

== Mission and training ==
The mission of 1st Reconnaissance Battalion is to provide task-organized forces in order to conduct amphibious reconnaissance, ground reconnaissance, battlespace shaping operations, raids, and specialized insertion and extraction.

== Organization ==
1st Reconnaissance Battalion currently consists of five companies. The companies (except for headquarters and service company) each consist of two platoons. The standard breakdown of the four subsequent companies consists of a reconnaissance and surveillance platoon and a VBSS platoon. Platoons are further divided into three reconnaissance teams, a jump team, dive team and mobility team. A reconnaissance team consists of 6 to 8 Reconnaissance Marines and Special Amphibious Reconnaissance Corpsman (SARC). While ideal and established doctrine, this organizational structure can be modified by battalion or company commanding officers as they see fit.

- Headquarters and Service Company
- Alpha Company
- Bravo Company
- Charlie Company
- Force Recon Company

== History ==
It was activated on 1 March 1937 as the 1st Tank Company, 1st Marine Brigade. In early 1940 the company was deployed to the Caribbean aboard USS Wyoming before returning to Quantico, Virginia. In November 1940 it was sent to Guantanamo Bay, Cuba.

When the 1st and 2nd Marine Divisions were created in 1941, each had a Scout Company of seven officers and 132 NCOs and enlisted men divided into a headquarters unit and three platoons. The unit had M3 Scout Cars and a motorcycle platoon. The 1st Tank Company of the former 1st Marine Brigade was re-designated as the Scout Company, 1st Marine Division Special Troops.

=== World War II ===
In 1941, Lieutenant Colonel William "Wild Bill" Whaling (not to be confused with OSS Director William J. Donovan), the executive officer of 5th Marine Regiment visualized and perceived the use for specialized missions encompassing reconnaissance at the division-level, which would be conducted above the normal infantry battalion-level in scouting and patrolling. He recommended to General Alexander Vandegrift the need of a special "Scout and Sniper unit" for the 1st Marine Division's operations on Guadalcanal. Upon approval, by February 1, each of the three companies were created for each regiment.

==== New Britain, December 1943 ====
Forming the southern of the Bismarck Sea and the Bismarck Archipelago, the island of New Britain was focused for seizure by General MacArthur as it would mean control of the Vitiaz and Dampier Straits. Planning began and decision was made to first seize Arawe Peninsula, an island, a town, a plantation and the Japanese occupation forces situated on the southern coast, sixty miles south across island from Cape Gloucester. Cape Gloucester was tasked for seizure by Major General William H. Rupertus, the landing force commander of the northern elements.

General Rupertus turned to his scout company's chief, 1st Lieutenant John D. Bradbeer, to lead a team of several Marine scouts to conduct amphibious reconnaissance patrols of New Britain. D-Day was determined on December 26, 1943. They landed on New Britain on September 24, 1943, at night by rubber boats from three PT boats, #110, #325 and #327 of the Motor Torepedo Boat Squadron 21, bringing Royal Australian Navy Lieutenant Kirkwall Smith, a former Australian coastwatcher who knew the area, and two natives.

For nine days, they paddled throughout the prospective landing beaches, locating coastal-defense guns, sketched the beaches and evaded the Japanese patrols in the area. Upon time of return to their PT boat pickup, they could not establish radio contact, so they paddled out into the Dampier Strait until they were able to get contact by radio to arrange recovery. Bradbeer's patrol were able to uncover that Japanese troop strength on New Britain was about seventy-five hundred men.

Forty-five days later of November 1943, Bradbeer accompanied Lieutenants Firm and Smith, and Ensign Gipe (a Navy hydrographer) and their small team and again landed from three PT boats on other proposed beaches. However, they never landing on the proposed landing beach, as it was quickly negated due to the cliffs just inland from the beach.

By December 26, 1943, six days prior to D-Day, or D-6, Bradbeer and 1st Lieutenant Joseph A. L. Fournier split the recon patrol, taking their six Marines to reconnoiter remaining portions of the island; Bradbeer and his team went north, Fournier's team reconned the south. Hours later, they both confirmed the usability of the selected landing beaches, reporting them only lightly defended. Within a few more hours both teams were recovered by their PT boats. While returning, a Japanese barge opened fire onto Bradbeer's PT boat, injuring three of the PT crew personnel. US Navy Lieutenant Paul T. Rennell, the PT boat's captain, was able to break contact and evade the Japanese safely. The reconnaissance they provided was the third and the last preliminary amphibious reconnaissance for the New Britain operation.

==== Peleliu and the Palaus, September 1944 ====
The III Amphibious Corps, led by Major General Geiger tasked MGen Rupertus's 1st Marine Division for the main assault landing on Peleliu. Originally, the 1st Tank Battalion's scout company were part of the "floating reserve", but was ordered ashore on D-Day, September 15, 1944. Early in the afternoon, Company D (Scout) reinforced Colonel Herman Hanneken's 7th Marines to cover the 5th Marines. The island was declared secured on November 27.

==== Northern Okinawa, April 1945 ====
On April 3, 1945, 1st Marine Division sent their scout company in front of their zone of action along the boundary of the 6th Marine Division to their north. The recon company, commanded by 1st Lieutenant Robert J. Powell, Jr., traversed by motorized patrols to the eastern shore of Okinawa, reaching the base of Katchin Peninsula by 1300. They received further orders to advance north up the east coast toward Hiazaonna. Along the way they encountered a lightly held tank trap, then returned to 1st Marine Division before dark. Colonel Edward Snedeker 7th Marine Regiment followed the recon action report of 1st Marine Division's Company D (Scout) and pushed across the island to the town of Hiazaonna, reaching it at 1830 on April 3, 1945.

=== North China ===
In the fall of 1945, the Reconnaissance Company was deployed to Tianjin in north China. It returned to Camp Pendleton, California, in June or July 1947.

=== Korean War ===
A selected platoon of Kenny Houghton's 1st Marine Division Reconnaissance Company was dispatched to Korea as part of 1st Marine Brigade (5th and 11th Marines) landing at Pusan. The remainder of the Company arrived with the remainder of the Division, and all landed at Inchon. Recon Marines from the 2nd Marine Division Recon later arrived to augment the reconnaissance unit including Lieutenant "Bull" Francis Kraince. Barry Crossman was the Executive Officer.

The organization was quickly altered from an amphibious unit of nine-man boat teams to a motorized unit of four-man jeep teams utilizing jeeps loaned by the United States Army. Using these vehicles the Company dispatched motorized patrols on a deep reconnaissance to scout from Wonsan and Hungnam to Huksori, an enemy supply depot some forty miles distant. An element of the Company acted as a point for Tobin's B/1/5 push on August 13, 1950, travelling by jeep about a mile forward of the infantry force.

In January 1951, the unit dispatched patrols to search out guerrillas in the Andong area and later, on one occasion, stayed concealed in a town for two nights tracing enemy cavalry and infantry patrols, and ended up by directing air strikes on them.

Marines from the 1st Recon Company made seven raids into North Korea from the USS Horace A. Bass (APD-124), one of which was conducted 12—16 August 1950, in which a combined force of sixteen Marines and twenty-five Navy Underwater Demolition Teams raided the Posung-Myon area destroying three tunnels and two railway bridges without losing one man.

Deactivated in on 30 April 1958, and reformed as the 1st Reconnaissance Battalion on 1 May 1958 as part of the 1st Marine Division.

=== Interim Years ===
==== Cuban Missile Crisis ====
1st Reconnaissance Battalion (Forward) deployed to Guantanamo Bay Naval Base, Cuba and Haiti in October–November 1962 to await the invasion of Cuba. Upon the resolution of the Cuban Missile Crisis, the battalion returned to MCB Camp Pendleton.

=== Vietnam War ===
==== Operation Kansas, June 1966 ====
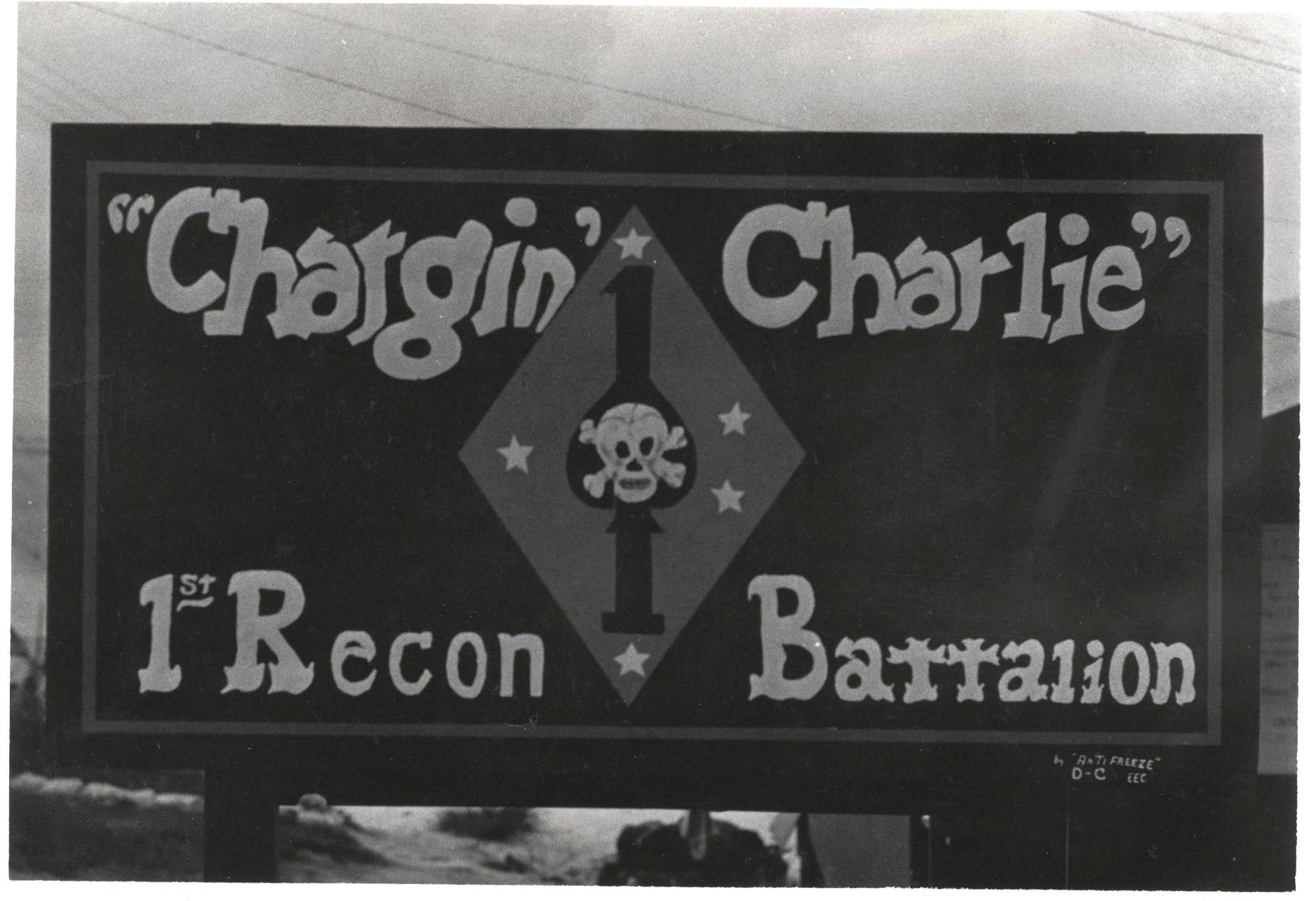
1st Reconnaissance Battalion Sign, ca. 1967.

By June 1966, the 1st Marine Division had plans to expand its assigned Tactical Area of Responsibility (TAOR) southward from Da Nang to Tam Kỳ, the capital of the Quảng Tín Province. Pressure from the Military Assistance Command, Vietnam (MACV) had placed Brigadier General William A. Stiles, the assistant division commander (ADC), position to respond by conceiving an operation by ordering an extensive reconnaissance effort between Da Nang and Tam Ky.

BGen. Stiles had divided the operation into two phases. The first phase was to send in his recon assets in an area in the vicinity of the Hiệp Đức District. The division's intelligence (D-2) section had sources of a headquarters of the People's Army of Vietnam (PAVN) 2nd Division lying somewhere near the western border of I Corps in the Quế Sơn Valley. The second phase consisted of a massive exploitation of the recon team's findings, by sending in a joint show-of-force; four infantry battalions from the 1st Marine Division and the ARVN 2nd Division.

On the afternoon of June 13, a thirteen-man recon team, accompanied by the command group, of 1st Recon Battalion landed by helicopters in the middle of the Quế Sơn Valley onto the small mountain of Nui Loc Son. In the course of the next 24-hours, six more recon teams were deployed in different strategic positioning sites, ringing the valley. This enabled the teams to actively report on enemy activity, and if possible, forward observe for either air strikes or artillery fire. Up to eight battalions were on full standby— four battalions of Marines and ARVN each, ready to deploy against any hostile forces encountered. One recon team worked their way south of Hiệp Đức after they set up positions along the heavily wooded Hill 555. They spotted several groups of PAVN of varying size that appeared to be training in the area.

The next day on June 14, a scout dog accompanying an enemy patrol caught scent of the nearby Marines and the patrol advanced towards their position; the recon team's leader immediately called for an extraction. A helicopter was inbound within minutes and the team hastily scrambled aboard and were safely flown back to Chu Lai Base Area.

The other five recon teams remained undetected and continued reporting on the enemy for the next two days, until the moment Team 2 spotted a large enemy formation as they took up positions on Nui Vu hill, at the east end of the valley. Staff Sergeant Jimmie E. Howard (a decorated Korean War veteran), called in numerous fire coordination support, from an ARVN artillery battery located at an Army Special Forces camp 7 km to the south.

The PAVN quickly adapted when they realized the barrage of artillery fire was more than mere coincidence; a battalion-size force was heading toward Nui Vu. On the night of June 15, a Special Forces team spotted the advancing enemy presence and alerted headquarters. However, they relayed the information too late. SSgt Howard had heard the enemy forces approach them as they amassed below them at the bottom of the hill. While the next few hours were quiet, by midnight, several of Howard's men spotted silhouettes as dozens of PAVN soldiers furtively climbed up the hill in the darkness. The PAVN instigated the fight by throwing grenades at the Marines. Greatly outnumbered, Howard's men held off the attackers.

Howard understood that they would soon be overwhelmed and radioed to his commander, Lt. Colonel Arthur J. Sullivan, for an immediate extraction. A short time later, the UH-34s were inbound. However, the helicopters were under immediate attack from machine gun fires, forcing them to return. Sullivan relayed the bad news back to Howard that they would not be able to be extracted until daylight.

Throughout the night, close air support, artillery strikes, and gunship fire support pounded the enemy, but the PAVN launched three strong attacks against Team 2. By 04:00 on 16 June, six out of eighteen Marines were killed in action and Howard was temporary immobilized from shrapnel wounds. Every other man was hit at least once. While they were suffering from ammunition shortages, some recon Marines resorted to throwing rocks at the enemy, others managed to pick up captured AK-47 rifles.

By dawn, Company C of 1st Battalion, 5th Marine Regiment (1/5) landed at the base of Nui Vu and reinforced recon Team 2. The Marines of 1/5 forced their way up the small mountain through scattered but strong resistance to reach Howard and his recon team. Howard and the surviving Marines were immediately evacuated; however, Charlie Company of 1/5 continued to battle for control of Nui Vu. The PAVN finally disengaged and withdrew, leaving 42 dead.

The first phase of Operation Kansas had ended, however, the second phase of the operation was changed. On June 17, the day before the first assault was scheduled, General Walt advised Gen. Stiles that the ARVN units would be unavailable due to the Buddhist Uprising in Huế. Although aware of the circumstances, both Generals Walt and Stiles decided to continue the effort. Overall, the recon teams reported over 141 sightings of enemy forces. The second phase of the operation commenced artillery and air strikes, dispersing the enemy. Operation Kansas ended on June 22, 1966.

==== Operation Washington, July 1966 ====
On 6 July 1966, Lieutenant Colonel Arthur J. Sullivan, battalion commander of 1st Recon Battalion, moved his battalion headquarters to Hau Doc, a location 25 km west of Chu Lai. For eight days his recon teams covered four-hundred square kilometers of his area of operation (AO); sighting forty-six PAVN that were scattered throughout the dense, rugged double- and triple- canopy jungle terrain, roughly ranging of 200 soldiers at most. The ground combat and supporting elements resulted only in thirteen PAVN killed, with four prisoners. Because of the poor results, General Lewis J. Fields, the commanding general of the Chu Lai TOAR, ended the operation on July 14, 1966.

==== September 1967 ====
On 5 September 1967, Nine Paratroopers [8 USMC and 1 Navy HM2] 1st Force Recon Company, 1st Recon Battalion, 1st Marine Division parachuted into "Happy Valley" southwest of Da Nang, Quanh Nam Provience Against North Vietnam/Viet Cong supply centers. Because of unexpected high winds the mission could not be completed and the members Evacuated. Loses were 3 injured and 1 MIA.

==== Operation Scott Orchard, April 1971 ====
Operation Scott Orchard was the last major 1st Marine Division operation of the Vietnam War, issued by the 1st Marine Division commander, MG Charles F. Widdecke. The operation began when Marines of 1st Recon Bn. commenced a heliborne assault into abandoned Fire Support Base (FSB) Dagger at 10:45 on 7 April 1971. After the brief firefight, the fire support base was declared secured. The plan was to reopen FSB Dagger in the Quế Sơn mountains by emplacing a provisional composite battery of 105-mm and 155-mm howitzers from the 1st Battalion, 11th Marines (1/11). FSB Dagger was used the previous autumn during Operation Catawba Falls. The intelligence sources from MACV had included reports of American prisoners-of-war were being held at an isolated camp in the mountainous region of the Quảng Nam Province, however no prisoners were found, contact was minimal and only abandoned base camps were discovered. The operation concluded on 12 April, the Marines had killed 4 PAVN/VC and captured 1 and 12 weapons.

The last elements of the battalion left South Vietnam on 13 May 1971.

=== Persian Gulf War ===
In 1990—1991, the 1st Reconnaissance Battalion participated in the Persian Gulf War. Upon returning from the Gulf War plans were enacted to break up 1st Reconnaissance Battalion and spread it out to AAV's, 1st Marines and 5th Marines. In June 1992 Alpha Company was moved and attached to Headquarters Battalion 1st Marine Division. Bravo Company was moved and attached to Headquarters Battalion 5th Marine Division. Charlie company was moved to the Marine Corps 8 wheeled amphibious assault vehicle (AAV) unit, forming LAR (Light Armored Reconnaissance). Delta Company was disbanded and folded into Charlie Company. Reconnaissance Company 5th Marines deployed as a company to Somalia in January 1993 and was spread around Somalia conducting reconnaissance and surveillance operations in Mogadishu, Biadoa and Bardere to help stop the flow of weapons being brought in by militant groups. Reconnaissance Company 5th Marines returned to Somalia on deployment multiple times in the next 5 years. Reconnaissance Company 1st Marines and Reconnaissance Company 5th Marines were brought back together in 2000 to reform 1st Reconnaissance Battalion in Camp Margarita, Camp Pendleton Ca, with only 50 unfilled billets on its first day.

=== Invasion of Iraq ===
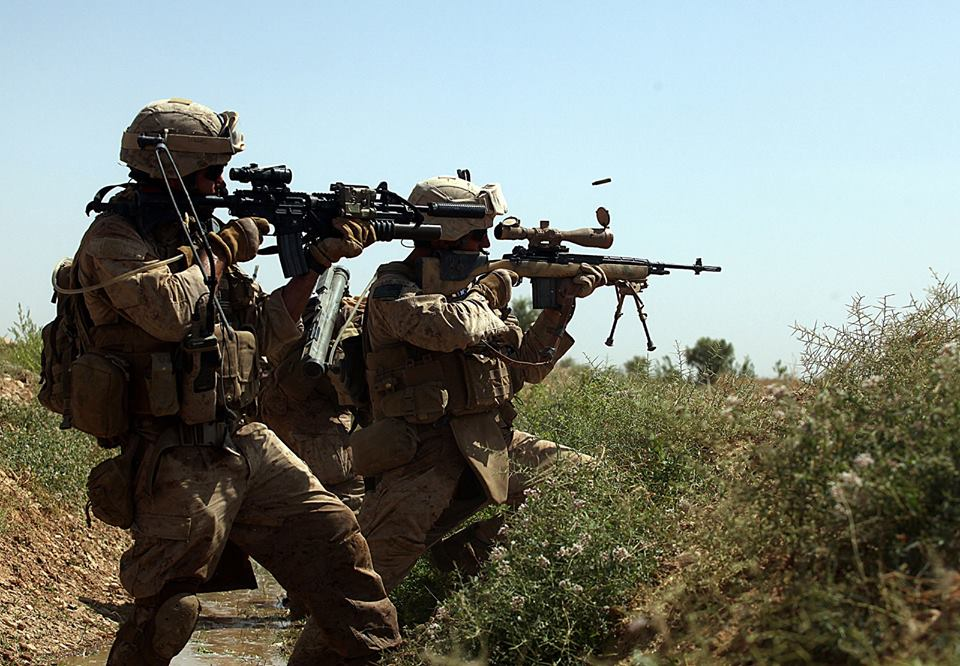
1st Recon Battalion in Afghanistan.

In January 2003, the battalion deployed to Kuwait in support of Operation Enduring Freedom. The 1st Reconnaissance Battalion participated in the 2003 invasion of Iraq from March 2003 to June 2003. The battalion redeployed to Iraq for Operation Iraqi Freedom from February 2004 to October 2004, where it took part in Operation Vigilant Resolve; September 2005 to April 2006, March 2007 to October 2007, and October 2008 to April 2009. In January 2006, the 1st Reconnaissance Battalion was in the national news for leading Operation Green Trident, which discovered over ten metric tons of insurgent munitions, hidden in caches throughout a large area south of Fallujah in the Euphrates River Valley. Marines of 1st Recon told military reporters that about 90 percent of their time in Operation Iraqi Freedom was spent in mounted patrols, using their Humvees.

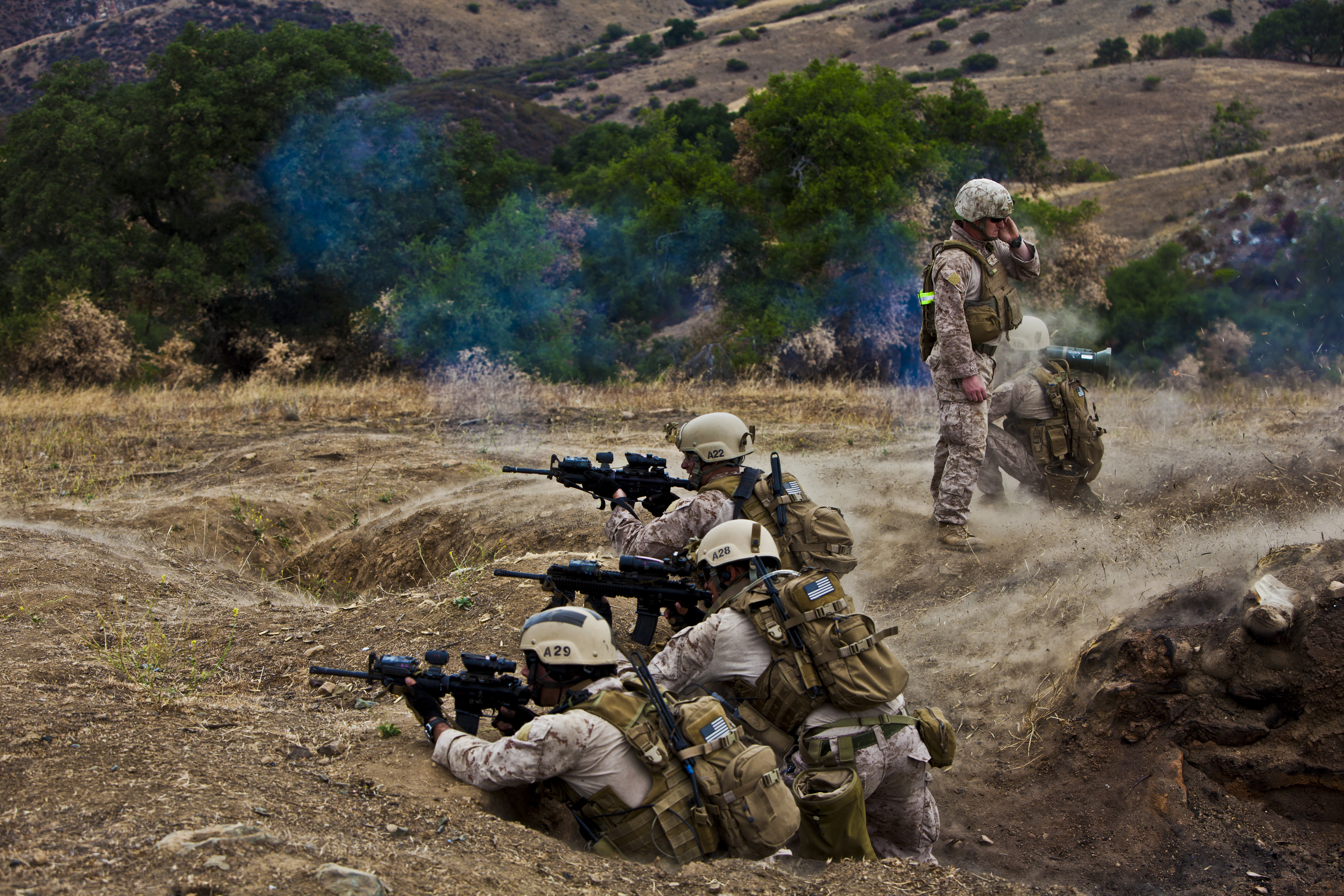
1st Recon preparing for an upcoming deployment with the 11th Marine Expeditionary Unit at Camp Pendleton, Calif, July 15, 2013

=== Afghanistan ===
The 1st Recon were also deployed to Helmand Province, Afghanistan in 2010 where they produced 300+ enemy KIA, did not lose a single man in their seven-month deployment and was regarded as "The deadliest battalion in Afghanistan right now" by Lt. Gen James Mattis.

The unit conducted a battalion-sized helicopter insert into the area of Trek Nawa, operating for 32 days straight, away from friendly lines, during that period there was contact with Taliban forces for 28 of those days using tactics and offensive action that stunned the local enemy forces. Following the missions in Trek Nawa and surrounding areas, the battalion deployed two companies to the Upper Sangin River Valley.

In February 2012, there was controversy when a September 2010 photograph was published showing members of Charlie Company, 1st Reconnaissance Battalion, posing in front of a flag with a logo resembling that of the German Schutzstaffel while serving in Afghanistan.

== Notable Marines ==
Medal of Honor recipients

- SSgt Jimmie E. Howard, Vietnam War, 16 June 1966.
- PFC Ralph H. Johnson, Vietnam War, 5 March 1968 (posthumously)

Navy Cross recipients

- Cpl Ricardo C. Binns, Vietnam War, 16 June 1966
- Capt Brent L. Morel, Global War on Terror, Operation Iraqi Freedom, 7 April 2004 (posthumously)
- GySgt Brian M. Blonder, Global War on Terror, Operation Enduring Freedom, Afghanistan, 8 August 2008

Other Notable Marines

- Col Wheeler L. Baker, commander from 1983 to 1985
- MSgt Brad Colbert, served during the Iraq War.
- Capt Nathaniel Fick, served during the Iraq War.

== See also ==
- Generation Kill (TV series)
- List of United States Marine Corps battalions
- Organization of the United States Marine Corps
