= Lödöse varv =

Shipbuilding company based in Lödöse, Sweden

Lödöse Varv AB is a Swedish shipbuilder located in Lödöse, Sweden. Its ships include MV Faina, captured by Somali pirates in 2008, as well as OT Rederierna (now sailing as Marabou), the tanker Akleja, the chemical tanker Professor K Bohdanowicz, MF Strada Corsara, and MS Vallann.
