= USS Vella Gulf (CG-72) =

Ticonderoga-class guided missile cruiser

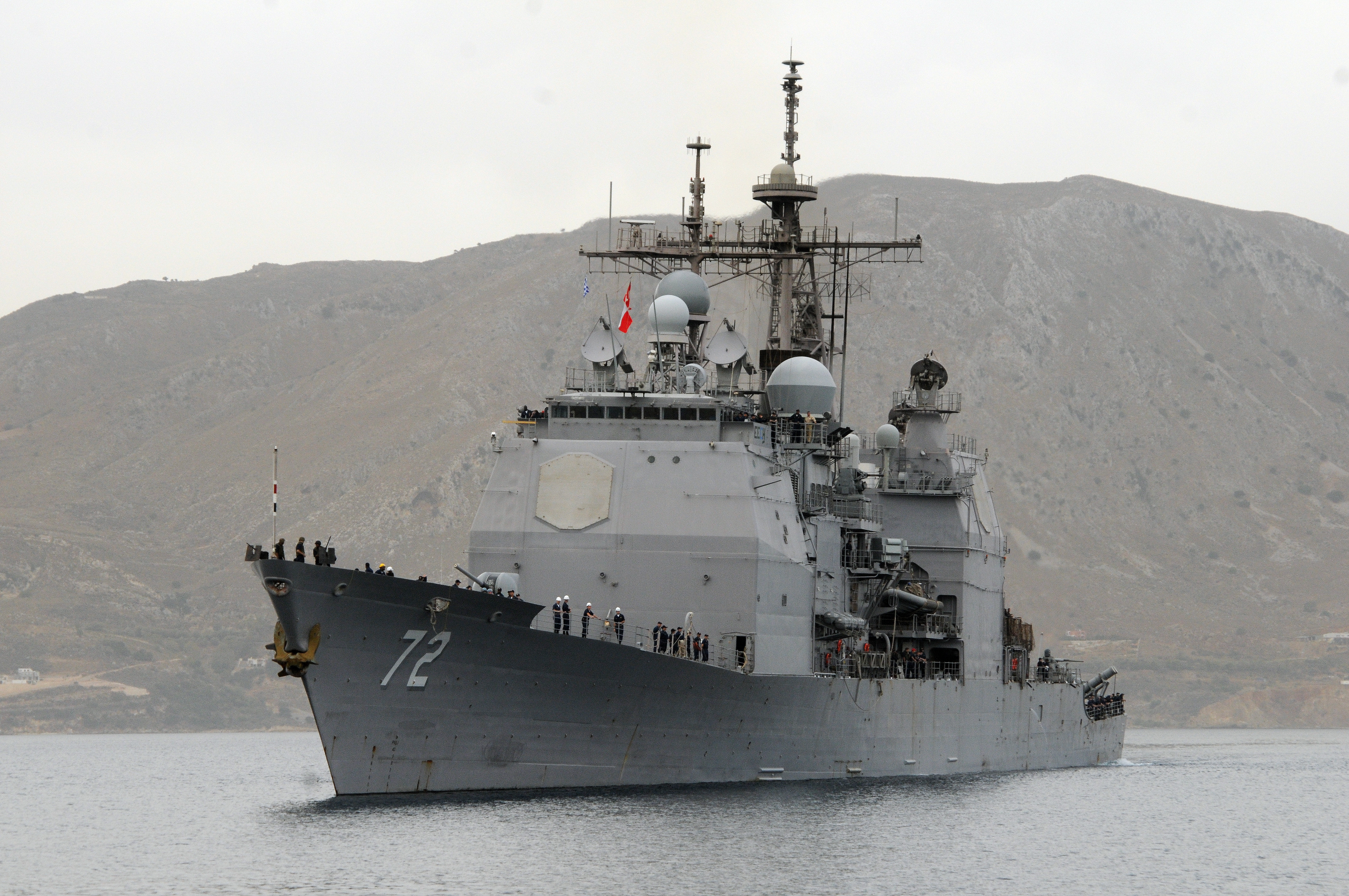
- Vella Gulf in 2010

History

United States
- Name: Vella Gulf
- Namesake: Battle of Vella Gulf
- Ordered: 25 February 1988
- Builder: Ingalls Shipbuilding
- Laid down: 22 April 1991
- Launched: 13 June 1992
- Sponsored by: Mary A. McCauley
- Acquired: 12 July 1993
- Commissioned: 18 September 1993
- Decommissioned: 4 August 2022
- Stricken: 30 September 2022
- Home port: Norfolk (during career)
- Identification: Call sign: NVLA; Hull number: CG-72
- Motto: Move Swiftly, Strike Vigorously
- Status: Stricken, Final Disposition Pending
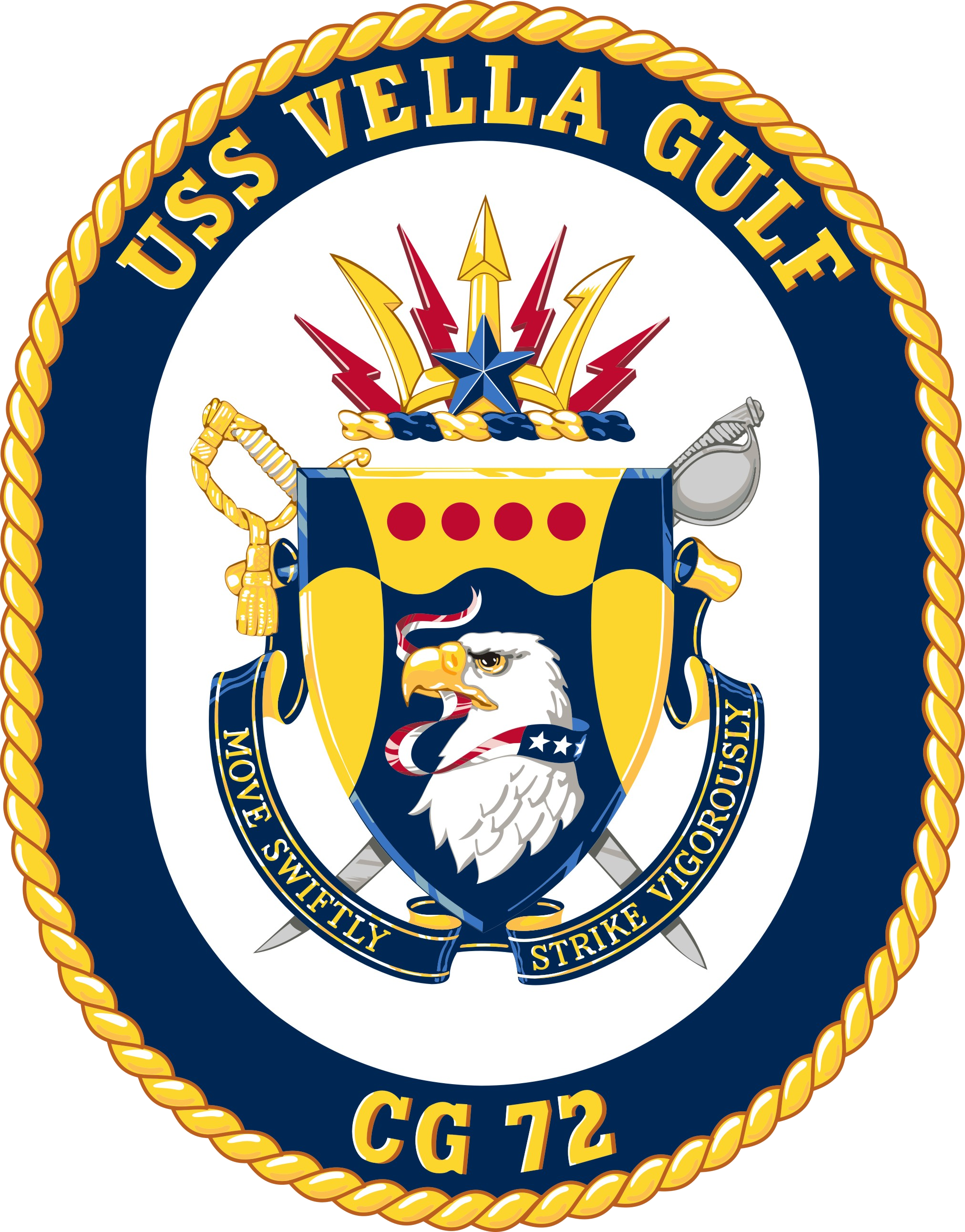
- Badge

General characteristics
- Class & type: Ticonderoga-class cruiser
- Displacement: 9,600 long tons (9,800 t)
- Length: 567 feet (173 m)
- Beam: 55 feet (16.8 meters)
- Draft: 34 feet (10.2 meters)
- Propulsion: 4 × General Electric LM2500 gas turbine engines; 2 × controllable-reversible pitch propellers; 2 × rudders
- Speed: 32.5 knots (60 km/h; 37.4 mph)
- Complement: 30 officers and 300 enlisted
- Sensors & processing systems: AN/SPY-1A/B multi-function radar; AN/SPS-49 air search radar (Removed on some ships); AN/SPG-62 fire control radar; AN/SPS-73 surface search radar; AN/SPQ-9 gun fire control radar; AN/SQQ-89(V)1/3 - A(V)15 Sonar suite, consisting of: AN/SQS-53B/C/D active sonar; AN/SQR-19 TACTAS, AN/SQR-19B ITASS, & MFTA passive sonar; AN/SQQ-28 light airborne multi-purpose system
- Armament: 2 × 61 cell Mk 41 vertical launch systems containing; 122 × mix of: RIM-66M-5 Standard SM-2MR Block IIIB; RIM-156A SM-2ER Block IV; RIM-161 SM-3; RIM-162A ESSM; RIM-174A Standard ERAM; BGM-109 Tomahawk; RUM-139A VL-ASROC; 8 × RGM-84 Harpoon missiles; 2 × 5 in (127 mm)/62 caliber Mark 45 Mod 4 lightweight gun; 2 × Mk 38 25 mm Machine Gun Systems; 2–4 × .50 in (12.7 mm) cal. machine gun; 2 × Phalanx CIWS Block 1B; 2 × Mk 32 12.75 in (324 mm) triple torpedo tubes
- Aircraft carried: 2 × MH-60R Seahawk LAMPS Mk III helicopters.

USS Vella Gulf (CG-72) is a decommissioned Ticonderoga-class guided missile cruiser that served with the United States Navy. She was the second ship named for the Battle of Vella Gulf, a naval engagement in the Solomons campaign of World War II, the first being USS Vella Gulf (CVE-111), an escort carrier commissioned in 1945. The ship's keel was laid down on 22 April 1991 at Pascagoula, Mississippi, by Ingalls Shipbuilding, then a division of Litton Industries. She was launched on 13 June 1992, sponsored by Mary A. McCauley, wife of Vice Admiral William F. McCauley (Ret.), and commissioned on 18 September 1993 at Naval Station Norfolk.

Designed as a multi-mission ship, Vella Gulf was capable of sustained combat operations in Anti-Air, Anti-Submarine, Anti-Surface, and Strike warfare environments. She supported carrier battle groups, amphibious assault groups, ballistic missile defense, as well as interdiction and escort missions. Her diverse combat capability was orchestrated by the Aegis Combat System, a fully integrated electronic detection, engagement, and fire-control system. Aegis enabled Vella Gulf to detect, evaluate, and engage an enemy with great firepower and accuracy.

== Ship history ==
=== 1990s ===
Vella Gulf successfully completed sea trials during the month of February 1998. In the months of May and June, she completed a two-month cruise, taking part in the 26th annual maritime exercise U.S. Baltic Operations (BALTOPS) '98 in the western Baltic Sea from 8 to 19 June 1998. During the exercise, the commander, Carrier Group Eight, commanded the exercise from the ship. She then completed an underway replenishment, her LAMPS helicopters moved aboard, she completed a successful command and control exercise (C2X), and had made a port call at Saint John, U.S. Virgin Islands. Upon the completion of C2X, Vella Gulf continued pre-deployment work-ups.

In January 1999, after winning her fifth consecutive "Battle "E"," the ship commenced training operations while hosting the week-long course Force Air Defense Commander training. Vella Gulf's successful completion, in February 1999, of Joint Task Force Exercise (JTFEX) '99 marked the end of a ten-month work-up. The vessel headed out for deployment to the Adriatic Sea on 26 March 1999. After a six-day transit, Vella Gulf took her position in the Adriatic Sea and participated in everything from Tomahawk Strike Ops to Fast-track Logistics Ops as part of Operation Noble Anvil. In May and June, Vella Gulf continued to participate in support of combat operations, fired Tomahawks, assumed warfare commander duties (ADC, ASUWC, ASWC and Launch Area Coordinator), and conducted numerous at-sea refueling and stores replenishment events until the relaxation of weapons posture and cessation of hostilities. Vella Gulf began the month of August engaged in multi-ship exercises, where she participated in DIVTACS, LeapFrogs, Tomahawk exercises, submarine exercises, Flight Ops, and Gunnery practice. On 22 September 1999 she returned home, then in November sailed to Yorktown, Virginia for a complete weapons offload.

=== 2000s ===
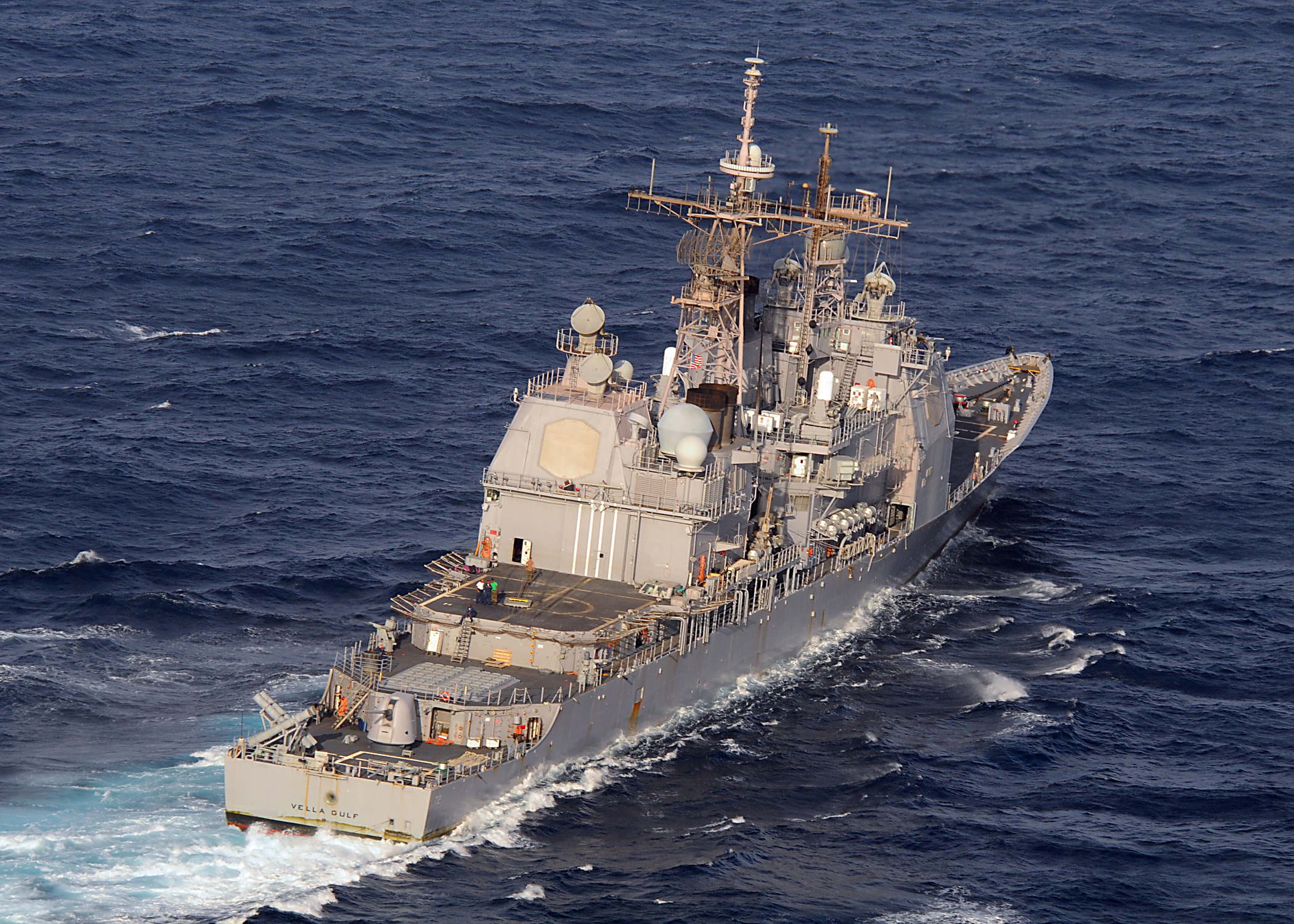
Aerial view aft of Vella Gulf during a high-speed turn, torpedo evasion exercise, 7 December 2008

As part of the USS George Washington Carrier Battle Group (CVBG), and in response to the terrorist attacks of 11 September 2001, the ship set sail in support of defense and humanitarian efforts off the coast of New York. A week later, she deployed as part of the USS Theodore Roosevelt Carrier Battle Group, to the Mediterranean, and South Asia in support of Operation Enduring Freedom. The Theodore Roosevelt Carrier Battle Group transited the Suez Canal on 13 October and arrived in the Arabian Sea on 15 October, before returning home in April 2002.

In March 2003 she was assigned to Carrier Strike Group Eight.

On 5 January 2007, Vella Gulf departed on a six-month cruise as part of the Bataan expeditionary strike group (BATESG). She conducted operations in the Persian Gulf, Northern Arabian Sea with the French aircraft carrier Charles de Gaulle (in support of Operation Enduring Freedom), Gulf of Oman and Gulf of Aden. She participated in multi-national exercises, including AMAN '07, hosted by Pakistan. Vella Gulf visited Agadir, Morocco and Gaeta, Italy as liberty ports of call, and twice visited Manama, Bahrain. She returned to her home port in Norfolk, Virginia on 3 July 2007.

==== Anti-piracy operations ====
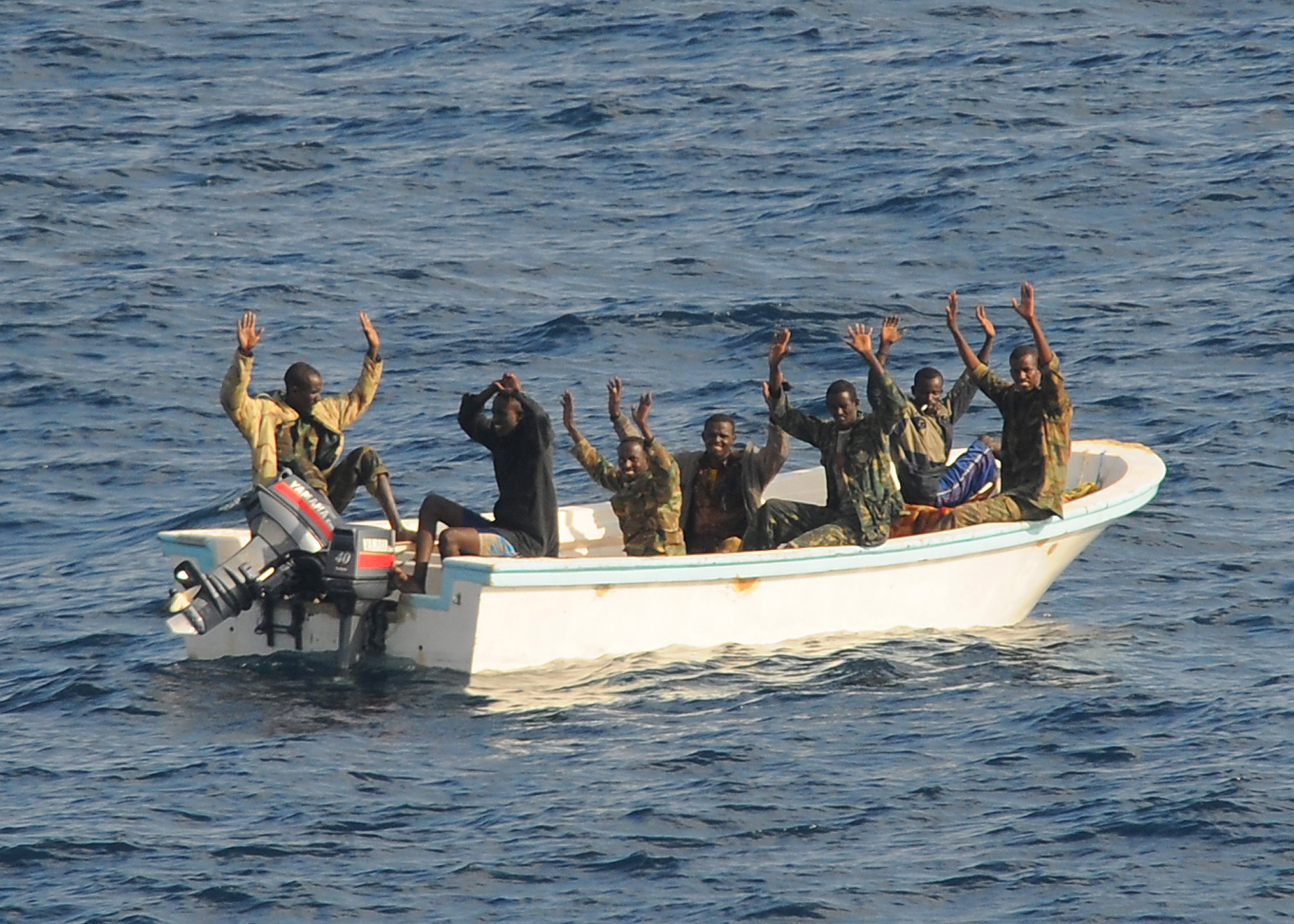
Suspected pirates surrendering to Vella Gulf, 2009

Vella Gulf was identified as one of the U.S. Navy ships surrounding MV Faina, a Ukrainian-owned, Belizean-registered ship carrying 33 T-72 tanks, RPGs and other munitions, after she was seized by pirates off Somalia on 25 September 2008. Ultimately the ship was not recaptured, and a ransom was paid.

On 11 February 2009 Vella Gulf responded to a distress call from the tanker Polaris in the Gulf of Aden. Polaris reported that pirates in a single skiff were attempting to board the tanker with ladders, though Polaris's crew was able to thwart their efforts. Upon arriving in the area, Vella Gulf intercepted a skiff with seven men aboard. The crew aboard Polaris identified them as the attackers, and they were taken aboard Vella Gulf, transferred to the supply ship USNS Lewis and Clark for processing, and sent to Kenya for trial.

The following day, 12 February, Vella Gulf responded to a distress call from the Indian freighter Premdivya which reported that she had been pursued by pirates who had fired at the ship. Vella Gulf dispatched a helicopter to the scene which fired warning shots and chased the pirate skiff down. Vella Gulf launched a boarding party in two RHIBs (inflatable boats) and captured nine pirates, who were again transferred to Lewis and Clark for processing.

=== 2010s ===
In 2012 while Vella Gulf was at sea, a petty officer sexually assaulted a female sailor, telling her he planned to kill her and dispose of her body overboard. He was subsequently sentenced to life imprisonment.

In December 2015 the ship was assigned to Carrier Strike Group 12. On 23 April 2017, Vella Gulf left for an eight-month deployment to support maritime security operations in the Persian Gulf." In July, she joined Carrier Strike Group 11 for three months, conducting air strikes against ISIL targets in Iraq and Syria. She returned on 15 December.

=== 2020s ===
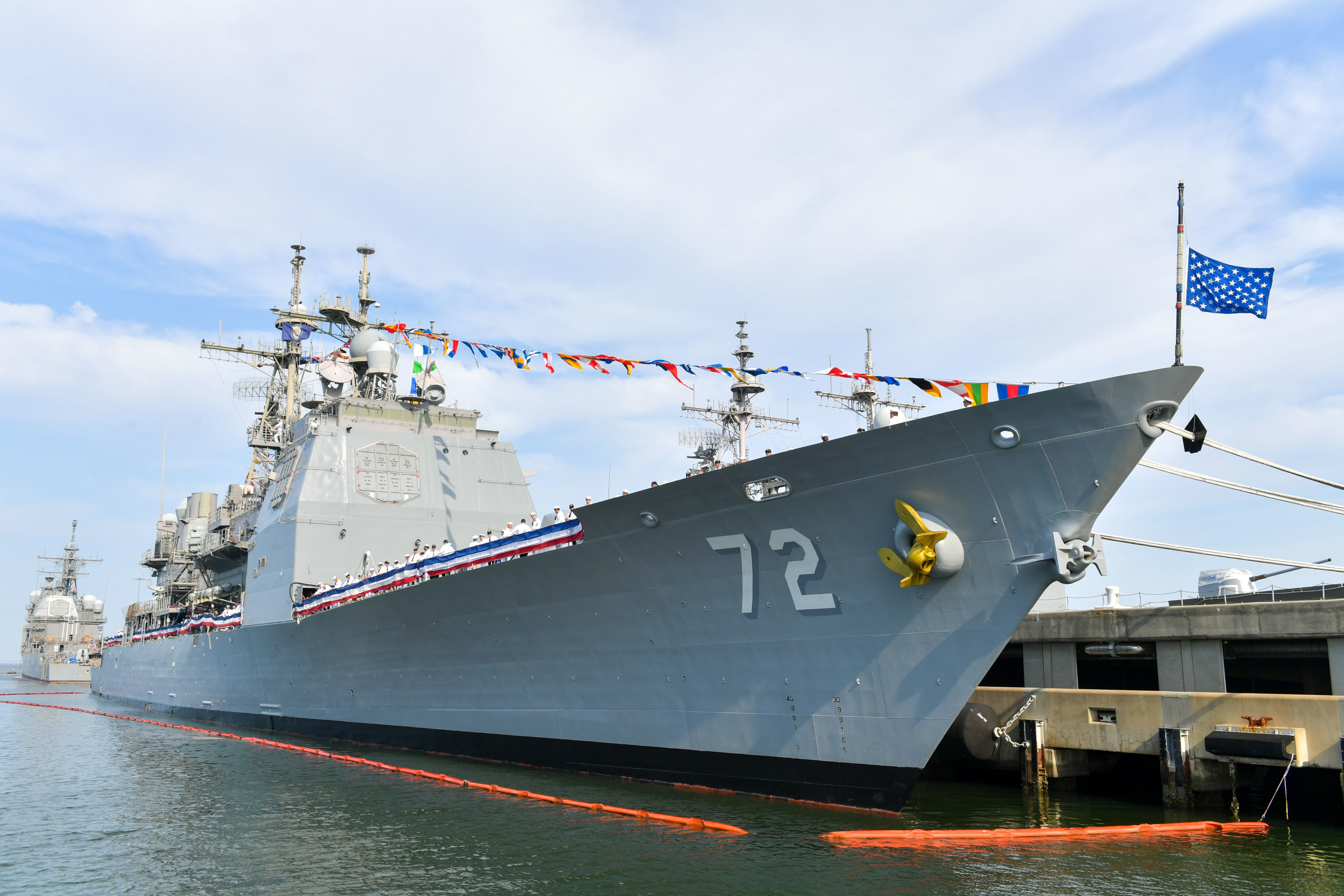
USS Vella Gulf (CG-72) during her decommissioning ceremony on 4 August 2022

In 2020, a U.S. Navy budget plan proposed putting Vella Gulf, along with her Ticonderoga-class sister ships Monterey, Shiloh, and Port Royal, on a path to early decommissioning, as they had not been modernized.

In December 2020 the U.S. Navy's Report to Congress on the Annual Long-Range Plan for Construction of Naval Vessels stated that the ship was planned to be placed Out of Commission in Reserve in 2022.

On 4 August 2022, Vella Gulf was decommissioned at Naval Station Norfolk following just under 29 years of service. Disposal arrangements have not been announced. The ship will be berthed at Philadelphia.

== Awards ==
- Navy Unit Commendation - 2021
- Battle E - 10 awards
- Armed Forces Expeditionary Medal
- Armed Forces Service Medal
- NATO Medal
