= USS Howard (DDG-83) =

Arleigh Burke-class destroyer in the US Navy

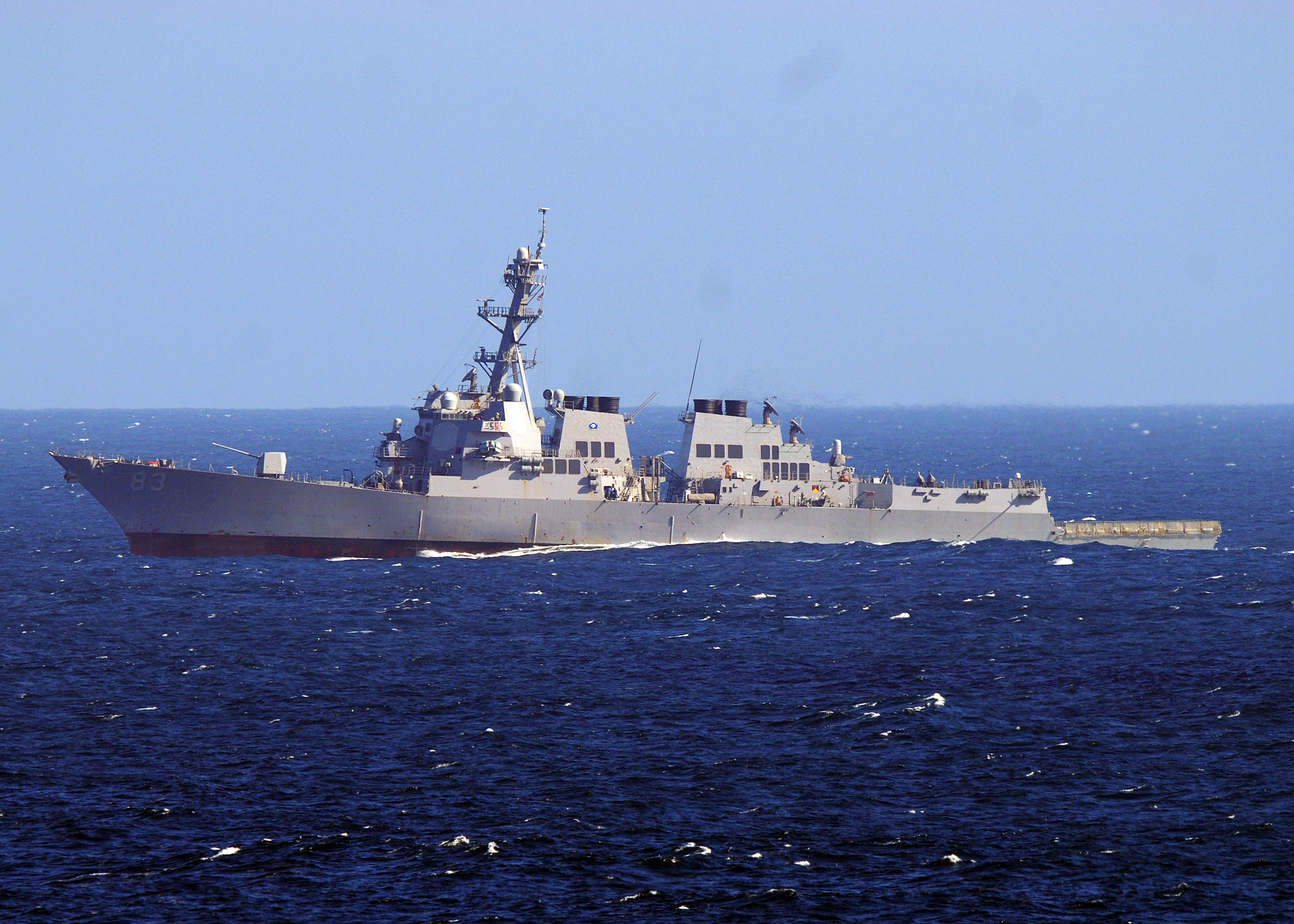
- USS Howard on 10 November 2010

History

United States
- Name: Howard
- Namesake: Jimmie E. Howard
- Ordered: 20 June 1996
- Builder: Bath Iron Works
- Laid down: 9 December 1998
- Launched: 20 November 1999
- Commissioned: 20 October 2001
- Home port: Yokosuka
- Identification: MMSI number: 303852000; Callsign: NHOW; Hull number: DDG-83
- Motto: Ready for Victory
- Honours and awards: See Awards
- Status: in active service
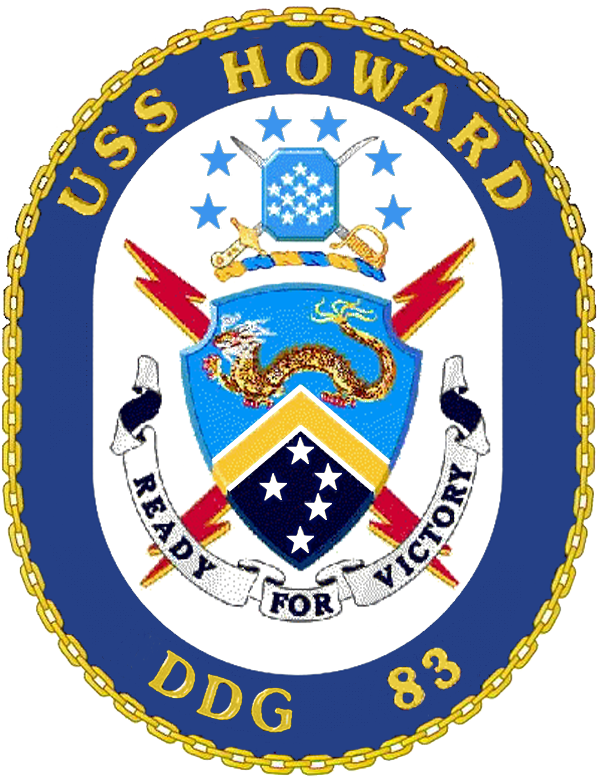
- Badge

General characteristics
- Class & type: Arleigh Burke-class destroyer
- Displacement: 9,200 tons
- Length: 509 ft 6 in (155.30 m)
- Beam: 66 ft (20 m)
- Draft: 31 ft (9.4 m)
- Propulsion: 4 × General Electric LM2500-30 gas turbines, 2 shafts, 100,000 shp (75 MW)
- Speed: exceeds 30 knots (56 km/h; 35 mph)
- Complement: 320 officers and enlisted
- Armament: Guns: 1 × 5-inch (127 mm)/62 mk 45 mod 4 (lightweight gun); 2 × 20 mm (0.8 in) Phalanx CIWS; 2 × 25 mm (0.98 in) Mk 38 machine gun system; 4 × 0.50 inches (12.7 mm) caliber guns; Missiles: 1 × 32-cell, 1 × 64-cell (96 total cells) Mk 41 vertical launching system (VLS): RIM-66M surface-to-air missile; RIM-156 surface-to-air missile; RIM-174A standard ERAM; RIM-161 anti-ballistic missile; RIM-162 ESSM (quad-packed); BGM-109 Tomahawk cruise missile; RUM-139 vertical launch ASROC; Torpedoes: 2 × Mark 32 triple torpedo tubes: Mark 46 lightweight torpedo; Mark 50 lightweight torpedo; Mark 54 lightweight torpedo
- Aircraft carried: 2 × MH-60R Seahawk helicopters

USS Howard (DDG-83) is an Arleigh Burke-class (Flight IIA) Aegis guided missile destroyer in the United States Navy. She is named for Medal of Honor recipient First Sergeant Jimmie E. Howard, USMC. Howard was the 19th ship of her class to be built by Bath Iron Works at Bath, Maine, and construction began on 8 December 1998. She was launched and christened on 20 November 1999. She was commissioned into the Navy on 20 October 2001.

Howard is currently a member of Destroyer Squadron 15 and Carrier Strike Group Five.

== Namesake ==
The ship is named in honor of 1st Sgt. Jimmie E. Howard, USMC (1929–1993), recipient of the Medal of Honor for his leadership of a platoon against repeated attacks by a battalion-sized Viet Cong force. After receiving severe wounds from an enemy grenade, he distributed ammunition to his men and directed air strikes on the enemy. By dawn, his beleaguered platoon still held their position. Howard had also received the Silver Star Medal for his service in the Korean War. Every time Howard set to sea from her previous homeport of San Diego, she passed within view of 1st Sgt. Howard's grave at Fort Rosecrans National Cemetery and saluted her namesake.

== Service history ==
On 16 February 2007, Howard was awarded the 2006 Battle "E" award. On 11 June 2007, it was announced Howard was the recipient of the Arleigh Burke Fleet Trophy for Calendar Year 2006.

On 28 September 2008, Howard was reported to be in pursuit of the Ukrainian ship Faina, which on 25 September 2008 was captured by Somali pirates en route to Kenya. Faina was reported to be carrying 33 Russian-built T-72 tanks along with ammunition and spare parts. Faina was eventually released by the pirates 5 February 2009.

In 2008, Howard provided humanitarian assistance to the Philippines.

On 26 November 2021, Howard made a port call in Wellington, New Zealand. It was the first time a U.S. Navy warship had made a port call in New Zealand since 2016.

On 10 August 2023, Howard experienced a "soft-grounding" outside of Bali, Indonesia. On 19 August 2023 Vice Admiral Karl Thomas, commanding Officer US 7th Fleet, removed Howard's Commanding Officer at the time, due to a "loss of confidence in his ability to command" as a result of the grounding.

On 1 December 2023, a small electrical fire broke out in the engine room of Howard, forcing 12 crew members to be temporarily transported to Naval Hospital Yokosuka Japan. On 6 February 2024, the Navy announced that Commander Cameron Dennis was also relieved due to a “loss of confidence in his ability to perform his duties.” Press reports indicated his removal was due to unprofessional comments he had made.

In March 2025, HOWARD received the highest Board of Inspection and Survey score for any Pacific Fleet Arleigh Burke destroyer in Fiscal Year 2025, and was awarded the "Champions Belt" by Commander Naval Surface Forces VADM Brendan McLane.

== Coat of arms ==
=== Shield ===
The shield has a background of light blue, dark blue, and gold. The upper shield consists of an oriental dragon, while the bottom contains stars configured to the Southern Cross.

The traditional Navy colors were chosen for the shield because dark blue and gold represents the sea and excellence respectively. The oriental dragon symbolizes the ship's service in the Pacific and fighting spirit of the platoon under the leadership of Gunnery Sergeant Howard. The stars are configured to the Southern Cross and represent the First Marine Division patch worn by Gunnery Sergeant Howard.

=== Crest ===
The crest consists of a Medal of Honor neck pad in the shape of a radar array with a crossed Navy and Marine sword.

USS Howard's combat actions and war fighting legacy are represented by the six battle stars. Gunnery Sergeant Howard was awarded a Medal of Honor for gallantry and intrepidity under fire, which is represented by the neck pad. The neck pad also highlights the modern warfare capabilities, represented with the AEGIS array. A Crossed Naval Sword and Marine Mameluke signify teamwork and cooperation, exhibited with support from USS Howard's advanced combat systems for Marines ashore.

=== Motto ===
The motto is written on a scroll of white with blue reverse side.

The ship's motto is "Ready for Victory". The motto is a reference to the honor, courage, and commitment of USS Howard's sailors for justifying she is ready for all operations in peace and will always be victorious in combat.

=== Seal ===
The coat of arms in full color as in the blazon, upon a white background enclosed within a dark blue oval border edged on the outside with a gold rope and bearing the inscription "USS Howard" at the top and "DDG 83" in the base all gold.

== Awards ==
Howard has been awarded the Navy Battle "E" several times

- 1 January - 31 December 2006
