= Hiệp Đức district =

Hiệp Đức District Huyện Hiệp Đức
- District
- Interactive map of Hiệp Đức District
- Country: Vietnam
- Region: South Central Coast
- Province: Quảng Nam
- Capital: Tân An

Area
  - Total: 190 sq mi (492 km^{2})

Population (2003)
  - Total: 40,281
- Time zone: UTC+7 (Indochina Time)

Hiệp Đức is a district (huyện) of Quảng Nam province in the South Central Coast region of Vietnam. As of 2003 the district had a population of 40,281. The district covers an area of 492 km^{2} (190 sq mi). The district capital lies at Tân An.
