= Compañía de Filipinas =

Cargo steamship that took part in the Philippine–American War and was sunk in WW2

History

- Name: 1890: Compañía de Filipinas; 1898: Filipinas; 1902: Compañía de Filipinas; 1942: Hoei Maru
- Owner: Cía Gen de Tabacos de Filipinas
- Operator: 1898: Republican Navy; 1942: Japanese Government
- Port of registry: Manila
- Builder: Lobnitz & Co, Renfrew
- Launched: 1 July 1890
- Completed: 1890
- Identification: code letters MBOG (until 1933); call sign KZEP (by 1935)
- Fate: sunk by aerial mine, July 1942

General characteristics
- Type: cargo ship
- Tonnage: 1914: 655 GRT, 397 NRT; 1935: 785 GRT, 390 NRT
- Length: 54.9 m (180.0 ft)
- Beam: 9.1 m (29.9 ft)
- Depth: 3.7 m (12.0 ft)
- Installed power: 88 NHP
- Propulsion: 1 × screw; 1 × triple-expansion engine

Compañía de Filipinas was a cargo steamship that was built in Scotland in 1890 for the Compañía General de Tabacos de Filipinas (CGTF). In the Philippine–American War the Navy of the First Philippine Republic armed her as its flagship and renamed her Filipinas. After that war she reverted to her original name and commercial service. In the Second World War, Japanese forces captured her and renamed her Hoei Maru. She was sunk in July 1945, shortly before the end of the war.

== Building ==
Lobnitz & Co built the ship in Renfrew, Scotland as yard number 342, launching her on 1 July 1890. Her registered length was 54.9 m (180.0 ft), her beam was 9.1 m (29.9 ft) and her depth was 3.7 m (12.0 ft). Her tonnages were 655 GRT, 397 NRT. She had a single screw, driven by a three-cylinder triple-expansion steam engine that was rated at 88 NHP. CGTF registered her at Manila. Her code letters were MBOG.

== Flagship Filipinas ==
In 1898, while she was inter-island service, the Revolutionary Navy (later the Philippine Navy) took over the ship as its flagship. The Revolutionary Navy initially consisted of a small fleet of eight captured Spanish steam launches refitted with Gonzalez Hontoria de 9 cm (mod 1879) guns, and then received a donation of five merchant ships, namely the Taaleño, the Balayan, the Bulusan, the Taal and the Purísima Concepción, before acquiring Filipinas. The acquisition was made possible by the Filipino crew of the ship, who mutinied under the Cuban Vicente Catalan, who proclaimed himself "admiral". When the Filipino flag was raised on the ship, the East Asia Squadron contested it and claimed the ship for Germany. Despite an impending naval incident, the ship remained under Filipino control until the Philippine–American War proved the naval superiority of the American Asiatic Squadron and decimated the Revolutionary Navy. After the US conquest of the Philippines, the ship was returned to CGTF and resumed her original name and commercial service.

By 1935 her tonnages had been reassessed as 785 GRT and 390 NRT, and the call sign KZEP had superseded her code letters.

== Hoei Maru ==
During the Philippines campaign in the Second World War, Japanese forces captured Compania de Filipinas off Fortune Island in 1942. She was taken into Japanese Government service and renamed Hoei Maru (豊栄丸). On 3 July 1945 an aerial mine sank her near Jindo Island.

This was the only Hoei Maru that was a cargo ship, but there were other Japanese vessels with the same name:

- Hoei Maru No. 2 (tanker), sunk by a mine on 10 September 1944
- Hoei Maru (minesweeper), sunk by torpedo on 29 September 1944
- Hoei Maru No. 3 (tanker), sunk by aircraft on 21 January 1945
- Hoei Maru No. 5 (tanker), sunk by aircraft on 6 May 1945
