= Philippine Navy =

Naval warfare branch of the Armed Forces of the Philippines

- Hukbong Dagat ng Pilipinas
- Seal of the Philippine Navy
- Founded: May 20, 1898; 128 years ago
- Country: Philippines
- Type: Philippine Navy
- Role: Naval Warfare
- Size: 27,270 active personnel (including 10,300 Marines); 15,000 reserve personnel 96 (+18) combat vessels 21 support vessels 34 (+14) aircraft
- Part of: Armed Forces of the Philippines
- Headquarters: Naval Station Jose Andrada, Roxas Boulevard, Manila, Philippines
- Patron: Our Lady of La Naval de Manila
- Mottos: "Protecting the Seas, Securing our Future"
- Colors: Navy Blue
- March: Himno ng Hukbong Dagat ng Pilipinas (Hymn of the Philippine Navy)
- Equipment: List of Philippine Navy equipment
- Engagements: Philippine Revolution; Spanish–American War; Philippine–American War; World War II; Korean War; Vietnam War; Communist Insurgencies; Moro conflict; New People's Army rebellion; Spratly Islands Dispute; Scarborough Shoal standoff; Battle of Marawi; Anti-piracy operations in Sulu and Celebes Sea
- Website: navy.mil.ph

Commanders
- Commander-in-Chief: President Bongbong Marcos
- Secretary of National Defense: Gilberto C. Teodoro
- Chief of Staff of the Armed Forces of the Philippines: GEN Antonio G. Nafarrette, PA
- Flag Officer-in-Command of the Philippine Navy: VADM Alan M. Javier, PN
- Vice Commander of the Philippine Navy: RAdm Juario C. Marayag, PN
- Chief of Naval Staff: RAdm Edwin M. Nera, PN
- Command Master Chief of the Navy: MCPO Rosimalu D. Galgao, PN

Insignia
- Flag

- Jack

- Ensign

- Pennant

- Battle Dress Uniform Sleeve Insignia

The Philippine Navy (PN) (Filipino: Hukbong Dagat ng Pilipinas) is the naval warfare service branch of the Armed Forces of the Philippines. It has an estimated strength of 24,500 active service personnel, including the 10,300-strong Philippine Marine Corps. It operates 96 combat vessels, 21 support vessels, 26 manned aircraft and 8 unmanned aerial vehicles. Tracing its roots from the Philippine Revolutionary Navy on May 20, 1898, while its modern foundations were created during the creation of the Offshore Patrol on February 9, 1939, the PN is currently responsible for naval warfare operations and maritime patrol missions within the Philippine Waters, as well as ensuring the protection of the Philippine's maritime interests, including the West Philippine Sea and Benham Rise.

It shares the responsibility of patrolling the maritime borders with the Philippine Coast Guard, a formerly attached unit which became a separate maritime law enforcement agency in 1998. The PN is also responsible for anti-piracy missions on the Sulu Sea, and also deploys naval assets for humanitarian assistance operations in the aftermath of disasters. The PN's headquarters is located in Naval Station Jose Andrada in Manila, and is currently led by the Flag Officer-in-Command of the Philippine Navy, who holds the rank of Vice Admiral.

== History ==
=== Pre-colonial period ===
Before the Spaniards arrived in the Philippines the ancient native people were already engaging in naval warfare, raiding, trade, piracy, travel and communication using various vessels including balangay. A flotilla of balangay was discovered in the late 1970s in Butuan, Agusan del Norte.

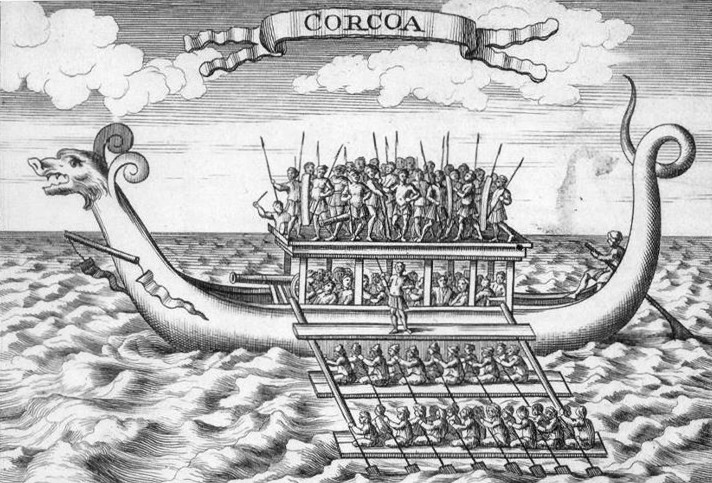
A Karakoa ancient warship with Lantaka cannons

Native Visayan warships, such as the Karakoa or Korkoa, were of excellent quality and some of them were used by the Spaniards in expeditions against rebellious tribes and Dutch and British forces. Some of the larger rowed vessels held up to a hundred rowers on each side besides a contingent of armed troops. Generally, the larger vessels held at least one lantaka at the front of the vessel or another one placed at the stern. Philippine sailing ships called praos had double sails that seemed to rise well over a hundred feet from the surface of the water. Despite their large size, these ships had double outriggers. Some of the larger sailing ships, however, did not have outriggers.

Antecedent to these raids, sometime between A.D. 1174 and 1190, a traveling Chinese government bureaucrat Chau Ju-Kua reported that a certain group of "ferocious raiders of China's Fukien coast" which he called the "Pi-sho-ye," believed to have lived on the southern part of Formosa. In A.D. 1273, another work written by Ma Tuan Lin, which came to the knowledge of non-Chinese readers through a translation made by the Marquis D’Hervey de Saint-Denys, gave reference to the Pi-sho-ye raiders, thought to have originated from the southern portion of Formosa. However, the author observed that these readers spoke a different language and had an entirely different appearance (presumably when compared to the inhabitants of Formosa).

The Luzones people, coming from Luzon and its kingdoms eventually came to become naval powers in Southeast Asia, as Luzones mercenaries where used in wars across Southeast Asia. The former sultan of Malacca decided to retake his city from the Portuguese with a fleet of ships from Lusung in 1525 AD. One famous Luzones was Regimo de Raja, who had been appointed by the Portuguese at Malacca as Temenggung (Jawi: تمڠݢوڠ) or Governor and General. Pires noted that Luzones and Malays (natives of Malacca) had settled in Mjmjam (Perak) and lived in two separate settlements and were "often at variance" or in rivalry with each other.

Pinto noted that there were a number of Luzones in the Islamic fleets that went to battle with the Portuguese in the Philippines during the 16th century. In 1539 Filipinos (Luções) formed part of a Batak-Menangkabau army which besieged Aceh, as well as of the Acehnese fleet which raised the siege under command of Turkish Heredim Mafamede sent out from Suez by his uncle, Suleiman, Viceroy of Cairo. When this fleet later took Aru on the Strait of Malacca, it contained 4,000 Muslims from Turkey, Abyssinia, Malabar, Gujarat and Luzon, and following his victory, Heredim left a hand-picked garrison there under the command of a Filipino by the name of Sapetu Diraja. Sapetu Diraja, was then assigned by the Sultan of Aceh the task of holding Aru (northeast Sumatra) in 1540.

Pinto also says one was named leader of the Malays remaining in the Moluccas Islands after the Portuguese conquest in 1511. Pigafetta notes that one of them was in command of the Brunei fleet in 1521.

However, the Luzones did not only fight on the side of the Muslims. Pinto says they were also apparently among the natives of the Philippines who fought the Muslims in 1538.

On Mainland Southeast Asia, Luzones aided the Burmese king in his invasion of Siam in 1547 AD. At the same time, Luzones fought alongside the Siamese king and faced the same elephant army of the Burmese king in the defence of the Siamese capital at Ayuthaya. Luções military and trade activity reached as far as Sri Lanka in South Asia where Lungshanoid pottery made in Luzon were discovered in burials.

The Battle of Bangkusay, on June 3, 1571, was a naval engagement that marked the last resistance by locals to the Spanish Empire's occupation and colonization of the Pasig River Delta, which had been the site of the indigenous polities of Rajahnate of Maynila and Tondo. Tarik Sulayman, the chief of Macabebes, refused to ally with the Spanish and decided to mount an attack at Bangkusay Channel on Spanish forces, led by Miguel López de Legazpi. Tarik Sulayman's forces were defeated, and Sulayman himself was killed. The Spanish victory in Bangkusay and Legazpi's alliance with Lakandula of Tondo, enabled the Spaniards to establish themselves throughout the city and its neighboring towns.

=== Spanish period ===
During the Spanish period, the Spanish forces were entirely responsible for the defense and general order of the archipelago, the Spanish naval forces conducts maritime policing in the seas as well as providing naval logistics to the Army. In the early years of Spanish era, most of the formations of the naval forces were composed of conquistadors backed with native auxiliaries.

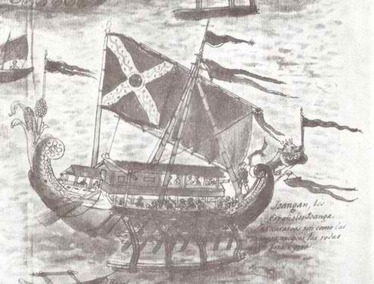
Illustration of a late 17th-century joangan warship carrying the Spanish Empire flag serving as auxiliary force vessel from Historia de las islas e indios de Bisayas (1668), this warship were known as joangas (also spelled juangas) by the Spanish.

Aside from Spanish Navy galleons, brigantines, galleys and other vessels, locally built Manila galleons were among the ships that composed the fleet tasked of protecting the archipelago from foreign and local invaders. Most of the personnel manning the ships are Filipinos while the officers are of Spanish descent.

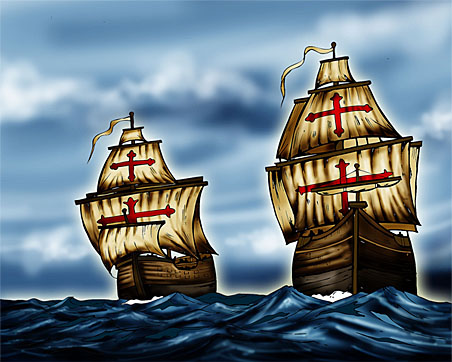
The two Manila Galleons—the Encarnacion and Rosario--which were hastily converted to warships to meet the superior Dutch armada of 18 vessels during the battles of La Naval de Manila in 1646. (From an artist's conception)

The Battles of La Naval de Manila were among the earliest naval conflict in the Spanish Philippines. It was a series of five naval battles fought in the waters of the Spanish East Indies in the year 1646, in which the forces of the Spanish Empire repelled various attempts by forces of the Dutch Republic to invade Manila, during the Eighty Years' War. The Spanish forces, consisted of two, and later, three Manila galleons, a galley and four brigantines. They neutralized a Dutch fleet of nineteen warships, divided into three separate squadrons. Heavy damage was inflicted upon the Dutch squadrons by the Spanish forces, forcing the Dutch to abandon their invasion of the Philippines.

By the 18th and 19th centuries, the sailors were already composed of mixed Spanish and Filipino personnel, as well as volunteer battalions composed of all-Filipino volunteers. Filipinos made up a large part of Spain's overseas forces including the Royal Spanish Navy.

=== Philippine revolution ===
At the outbreak of the Philippine Revolution, the Filipino members of the Spanish Army and Navy mutinied and switched allegiance from Spain to the Philippines.

The Republic's need for a naval force was first provided for by Filipino revolutionaries when they included a provision in the Biák-na-Bató Constitution. This authorised the government to permit privateers to engage foreign enemy vessels.

(w)hen the necessary army is organized … for the protection of the coasts of the Philippine archipelago and its seas; then a secretary of the navy shall be appointed and the duties of his office added to this Constitution.

— Gen. Emilio Aguinaldo on the Biák-na-Bató Constitution

On May 1, 1898, the first ship handed by Admiral George Dewey to the Revolutionary Navy is a small pinnace from the Reina Cristina of Admiral Patricio Montojo, which was named Magdalo.

The Philippine Navy was established during the second phase of the Philippine Revolution when General Emilio Aguinaldo formed the Revolutionary Navy which was initially composed of a small fleet of eight Spanish steam launches captured from the Spaniards. The ships were refitted with 9-centimeter guns. The rich, namely Leon Apacible, Manuel Lopez and Gliceria Marella de Villavicencio, later donated five other vessels of greater tonnage, the Taaleño, the Balayan, the Bulusan, the Taal and the Purísima Concepción. The 900-ton inter-island tobacco steamer further reinforced the fleet, Compania de Filipinas (renamed as the navy flagship Filipinas), captained by Cuban-Filipino Vicente Catalan who was proclaimed an admiral of the Philippine Navy, this was joined by steam launches purchased from China and other watercraft donated by wealthy patriots.

Naval stations were later established to serve as ships' home bases in the following:

- Ports of Aparri
- Ports of Legazpi
- Ports of Balayan
- Ports of Calapan
- Ports of San Roque, Cavite

On September 26, 1898, Aguinaldo appointed Captain Pascual Ledesma (a merchant ship captain) as Director of the Bureau of the Navy, assisted by Captain Angel Pabie (another merchant ship captain). After the passing of the Malolos Constitution the Navy was transferred from the Ministry of Foreign Relations to the Department of War (thereafter known as the Department of War and the Navy) headed by Gen. Mariano Trías.

As the tensions between Filipinos and Americans erupted in the 1899 and a blockade on naval forces by the Americans continued, the Philippine naval forces started to be decimated.

=== American colonial period ===
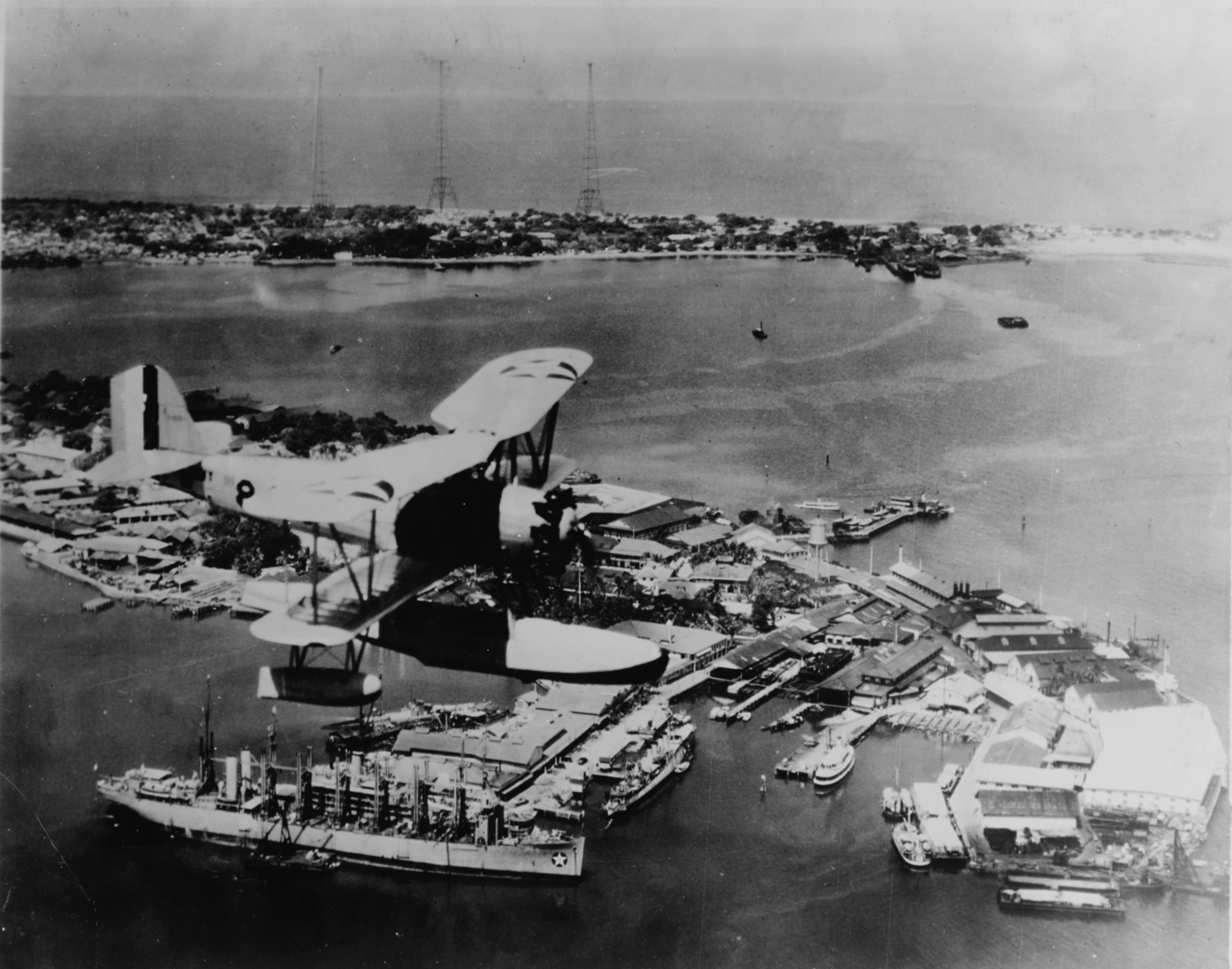
A U.S. Navy Vought O2U Corsair floatplane flying over the Cavite Navy Yard, c. 1930

The American colonial government in the Philippines created the Bureau of the Coast Guard and Transportation, which aimed to maintain peace and order, transport Philippine Constabulary troops throughout the archipelago, and guard against smuggling and piracy. The Americans employed many Filipino sailors in this bureau and in the Bureaus of Customs and Immigration, Island and Inter-Island Transportation, Coast and Geodetic Survey, and Lighthouses. They also reopened the former Spanish colonial Escuela Nautica de Manila, which was renamed the Philippine Nautical School, adopting the methods of the United States Naval Academy at Annapolis. The U.S. Naval Academy accepted its first Filipino midshipman in 1919, and Filipinos were able to enlist in the U.S. Navy, just as they were formerly able to do in the Spanish Navy.

=== World War II and Japanese occupation (1941–1945) ===
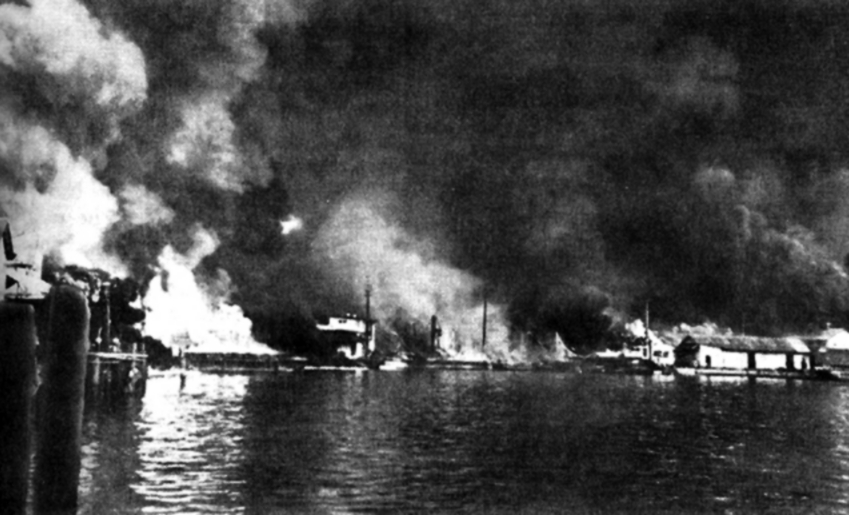
Sangley Point Cavite Navy Yard burning after a Japanese air attack on December 10, 1941. Small-arms shells explode (left) and a torpedo-loaded barge (center) burns.

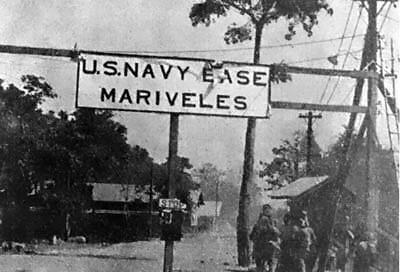
Mariveles Naval Section Base was used by the US Navy's Asiatic Fleet during the Second World War.

In 1935, the Commonwealth Government passed the National Defense Act, which aimed to ensure the security of the country. This was criticized because it placed the burden of the defense of the Philippines on ground forces, which in turn, was formed from reservists. It discounted the need for a Commonwealth air force and navy, and naval protection was provided by the United States Asiatic Fleet.

"A relatively small fleet of such vessels, ...will have distinct effect in compelling any hostile force to approach cautiously and by small detachments."

— Gen. Douglas MacArthur, Military Advisor to the Philippines regarding the newest Offshore Patrol (OSP) PT boats

When World War II began, the Philippines had no significant naval forces after the United States withdrew the Asiatic Fleet following the attack on Pearl Harbor by the Imperial Japanese Navy. The Philippines had to rely on its Offshore Patrol (OSP) Force with headquarters located at Muelle Del Codo, Port Area, Manila, composed of five high-speed Thorneycroft Coast Motor Boat (CMB) 55-foot (17 m) and 65-foot (20 m) PT boats, also known as Q-boats, to repel Japanese attacks from the sea.

During the course of the war, the OSP were undaunted by the enemy's superiority which they fought with zeal, courage and heroism. For its intrepid and successful missions and raids on enemy ships, the unit was dubbed the "Mosquito Fleet" mainly because of its minuscule size, speed and surprise, it showed its capability to attack with a deadly sting. The unit was cited for gallantry in action when its Q-boats Squadron shot three of nine Japanese dive bombers as they were flying towards shore installations in Bataan. The OSP participated in the evacuation of high Philippine and U.S. government officials from Manila to Corregidor when Manila was declared an open city. Surviving personnel of the Offshore Patrol that didn't surrender after April 9, 1942, to the Japanese, conducted the recognized guerrilla and local military troops of the Philippine Commonwealth Army were hit-and-run attacks against the occupying Japanese forces until the return of U.S. Forces. By the end of the war, 66 percent of its men were awarded the Silver Star Medal and other decorations for gallantry in action.

=== Post-war era (1945-1965) ===
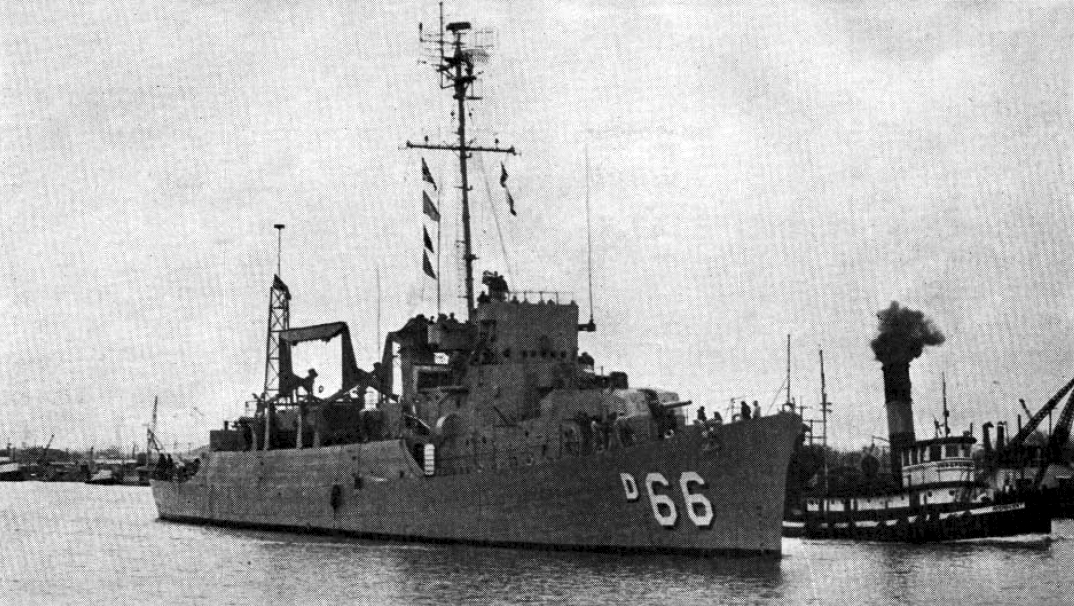
RPS Rajah Soliman (D-66) served as the flagship of the Philippine Navy from 1960 to 1964.

In 1945, after the liberation of the Philippines, the OSP was reactivated and led by Major Jose Andrada, to reorganize and rebuild from a core of surviving OSP veterans, plus additional recruits. The OSP was strengthened in 1947 after President of the Philippines Manuel Roxas issued Executive Order No. 94. This order elevated the Patrol to a major command that was equal with the Philippine Army, Constabulary, and Air Force. The OSP was renamed the Philippine Naval Patrol, later on changed its name again to the Philippine Navy on January 5, 1951. The first commanding officer of the Navy, Jose Andrada, became its first Commodore and Chief. This was also the year when the naval aviation arm of the Navy was formed, now the Naval Air Group.

In 1950, Secretary of Defense Ramon Magsaysay created a marine battalion with which to carry out amphibious attacks against the Communist Hukbalahap movement. The next year, President Elpidio Quirino issued Executive Order No. 389, re-designating the Philippine Naval Patrol as the Philippine Navy. It was to be composed of all naval and marine forces, combat vessels, auxiliary craft, naval aircraft, shore installations, and supporting units that were necessary to carry out all functions of the service.

The Philippine Navy participated in the Korean War, providing Combat Service Support and Escort Operations and in the Vietnam War Transporting the Philippine Contingent In January 1958, the Navy conducted its first US-Philippine naval exercise since the country's 1946 liberation. The exercise was known as Operation "Bulwark One" or Exercise "Bulwark", a harbor defense exercise commanded by a Philippine naval officer. By the 1960s, the Philippine Navy was one of the best-equipped navies in Southeast Asia.

=== The Marcos Sr. administration (1965–1986) ===
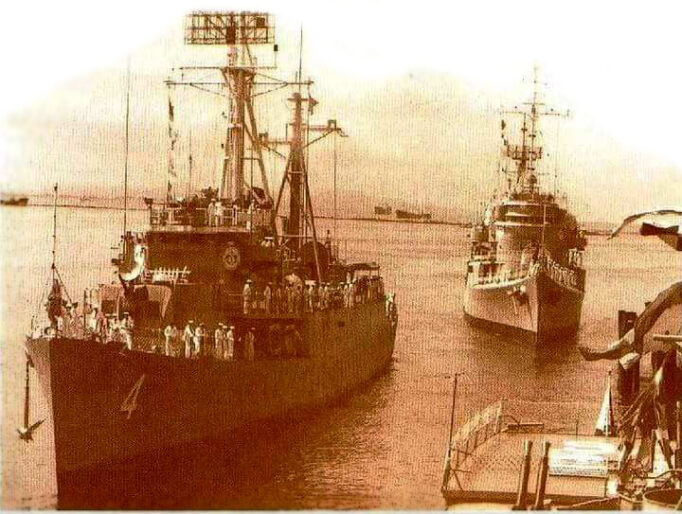
BRP Rajah Lakandula(PF-4) and BRP Andres Bonifacio(PF-7) during a Fleet Review in Headquarters Philippine Navy (1970s)

In 1967 during the first term of Ferdinand Marcos, the maritime law enforcement functions of the Navy were transferred to the Philippine Coast Guard. The duties would stay with the coast guard after 1998 when it became an independent service under the Office of the President and later on the Department of Transportation.

Beginning in the 1970s, the government had to shift its attention towards the Communist insurgency, and this led to the strengthening of the Philippine Army and the Philippine Air Force while naval operations were confined to troop transport, naval gunfire support, and blockade.

One major engagement during this period was the 1974 Battle of Jolo, a confrontation with the Moro National Liberation Front (MNLF) which ended with the destruction of a large part of the Municipality of Jolo. Navy Rear Admiral Romulo Espaldon would later be commended by the municipality for sending naval ships to the Jolo Pier to bring stranded Joloanos to safety, and for playing a big part in the later efforts to rehabilitate Jolo.

=== Later 20th Century (1986-2000) ===
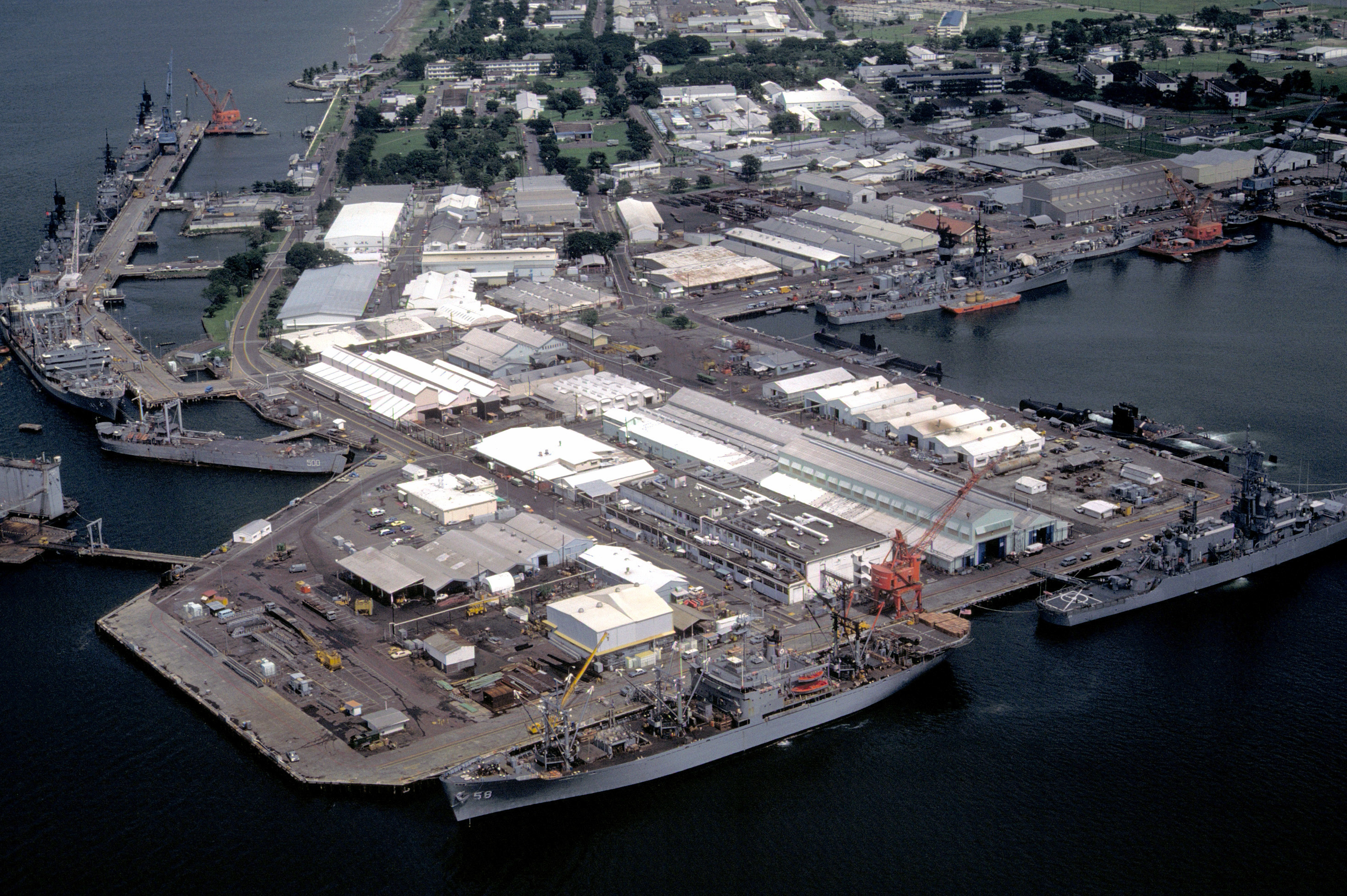
Naval Base Subic Bay during the US military presence in the Philippines.

The fate of the US military bases in the country was greatly affected by the end of the Cold War, and by the catastrophic eruption of Mount Pinatubo in 1991 which engulfed the installations with ash and lava flows. The nearby Clark Air Base was eventually abandoned afterwards, while the Philippine Senate voted to reject a new treaty for Subic Naval Complex, its sister American installation in Zambales. This occurrence had effectively ended the century-old US military presence in the country, even as President Corazon Aquino tried to extend the lease agreement by calling for a national referendum. This left a security vacuum in the region and terminated the flow of economic and military aid into the Philippines.

Concerns about the Chinese incursion to the sea features claimed by the Philippines and other Southeast Asian states arose after the Chinese construction of a military outpost at the Mischief Reef in 1995. As a response, the Philippine Navy dispatched the BRP Sierra Madre and deliberately ran it aground in the Second Thomas Shoal, 5 miles from the Chinese facility and south of the rumored oil-rich Reed Bank, which it maintains as its own station today.

The importance of territorial defense capability was highlighted in the public eye in 1995 when the AFP published photographs of Chinese structures on Mischief Reef in the Spratlys. Initial attempts to improve the capabilities of the armed forces happened when a law was passed in the same year for the sale of redundant military installations and devote 35% of the proceeds for the AFP upgrades. Subsequently, the legislature passed the AFP Modernization Act. The law sought to modernize the AFP over a 15-year period, with minimum appropriation of 10-billion pesos per year for the first five years, subject to increase in subsequent years of the program. The modernization fund was to be separate and distinct from the rest of the AFP budget. The Asian Financial Crisis which struck the region on 1997, greatly affected the AFP Modernization Program due to the government's austerity measures meant to turn the economy around after suffering from losses incurred during the financial crisis.

In 1998, following the closure of US bases, the Philippines-US Visiting Forces Agreement (VFA) was signed which contained guidelines for the conduct and protection of American troops visiting the Philippines and stipulated the terms and conditions for the American military to enter Philippine territory. The VFA is a reciprocal agreement that also outlines the requirements for Philippine troops visiting the United States. The Visiting Forces Agreement led to the establishment of the Balikatan exercises, an annual US-Philippine military exercise, as well as a variety of other cooperative measures including the Philippine Bilateral Exercises (PHIBLEX) between the naval forces of the two countries.

=== Contemporary period (2000–present) ===
The next decade ushered in a cordial relationship between China and its maritime neighbors including the Philippines until 2011 when tensions rose again after consecutive incidents occurred in the disputed territories. In 2012, a Philippine surveillance aircraft identified Chinese fishing vessels at the then Philippine-controlled Scarborough Shoal, causing the Philippine Navy to deploy the BRP Gregorio del Pilar to the area. In response, China sent surveillance ships to warn the Navy to leave the area claimed by both countries, prompting a standoff. The two nations eventually agreed to withdraw their deployed vessels as the arrival of the typhoon season drew near. Following a 3-month standoff between Philippine and Chinese vessels around Scarborough Shoal, China informed the Philippines that Chinese coast guard vessels will remain permanently on the shoal as an integral part of their 'Sansha City' in the Woody island of the Paracels, a separate archipelago disputed by China and Vietnam. Under the control of Hainan Province. the Chinese government plans the island-city to have administrative control over a region that encompasses not only the Paracels, but Macclesfield Bank, a largely sunken atoll to the east, and the Spratly Islands to the south.

Philippines Navy placed orders for Brahmos Supersonic cruise missiles as part of modernization plans.

The incidents with the Chinese presence in the South China Sea prompted the Philippines to proceed with formal measures while challenging the Chinese activities in some of the sea features in the disputed island chain. Hence, the South China Sea Arbitration Case was filed by the Philippines in 2013 at the International Tribunal for the Law of the Sea (ITLOS). Reminiscent to what occurred on 1995, the Congress passed the Revised AFP Modernization Act of 2012, this was meant to replace the older AFP Modernization Act of 1995, when the 15-year program expired in 2010. Major naval assets for acquisition under the new AFP Modernization Program include: 2 frigates, 2 corvettes, 2 strategic sealift vessels (SSV), 6 offshore patrol vessels, missile and other weapon systems upgrade, among others. However, the Navy remains unable to protect other Philippine Reefs that have been claimed by the Chinese. In March 2020, the Navy decommissioned four ships, including two vessels that had served with the US Navy in World War II.

== Vision ==
By 2028, we shall be a modern, multi-capable naval force responsive to our maritime nation's defense and development.

— Philippine Navy,

== Mission ==
To organize, train, equip, maintain, develop, and deploy forces for prompt and sustained naval and maritime operation to accomplish the AFP's mission.

== Core Values ==
- Honor
- Dedication
- Patriotism
- Solidarity
- Leadership
- Professionalism

When each of the initial letters of all six Core Values are derived, one will get H.D.P.S.L.P., which can be deduced to mean Hukbong Dagat ng Pilipinas - Sandatahang Lakas ng Pilipinas ("Philippine Navy - Armed Forces of the Philippines" in the national language, Filipino).

== Organization ==
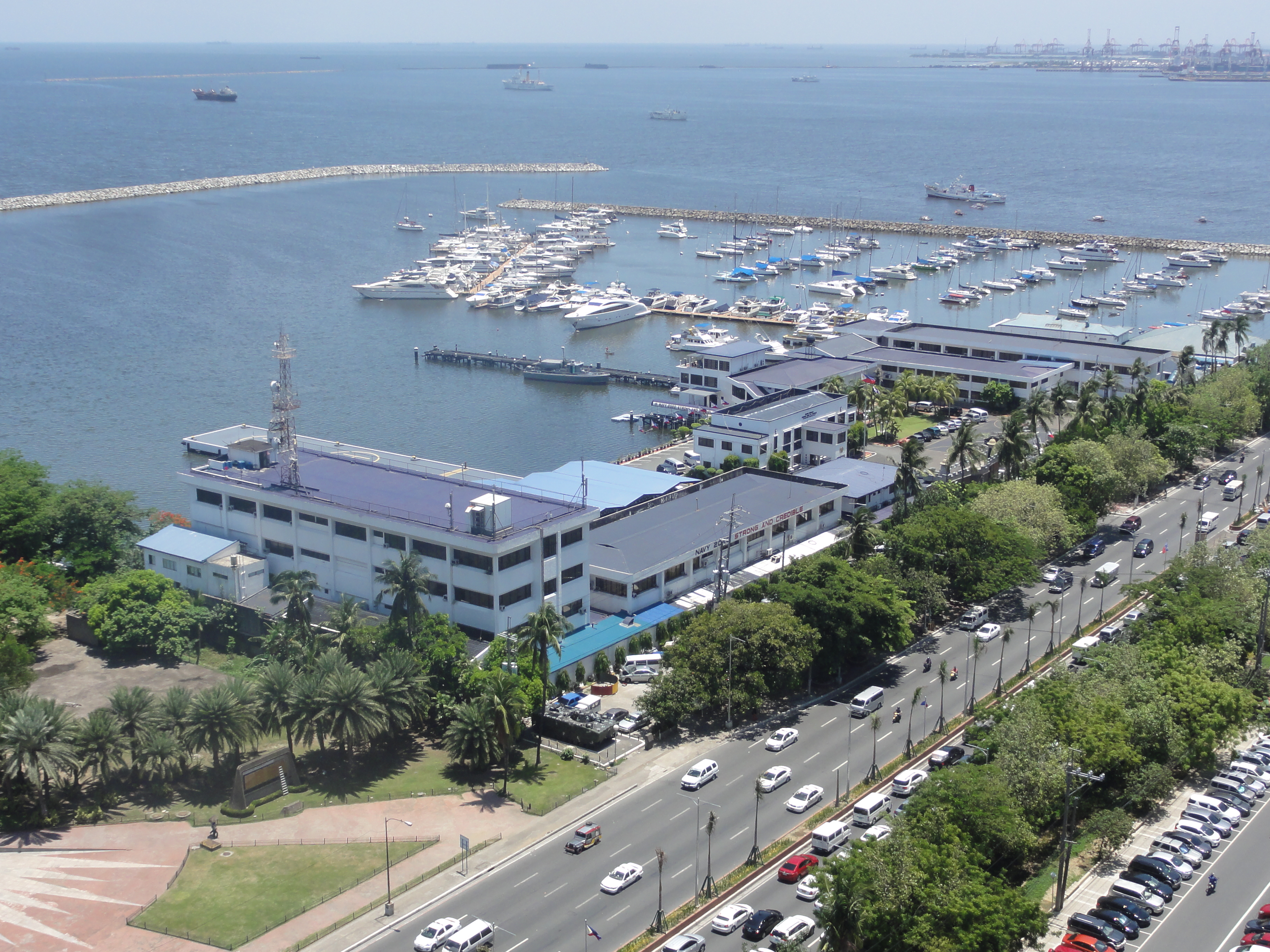
Aerial view of the Philippine Navy Headquarters in Manila.

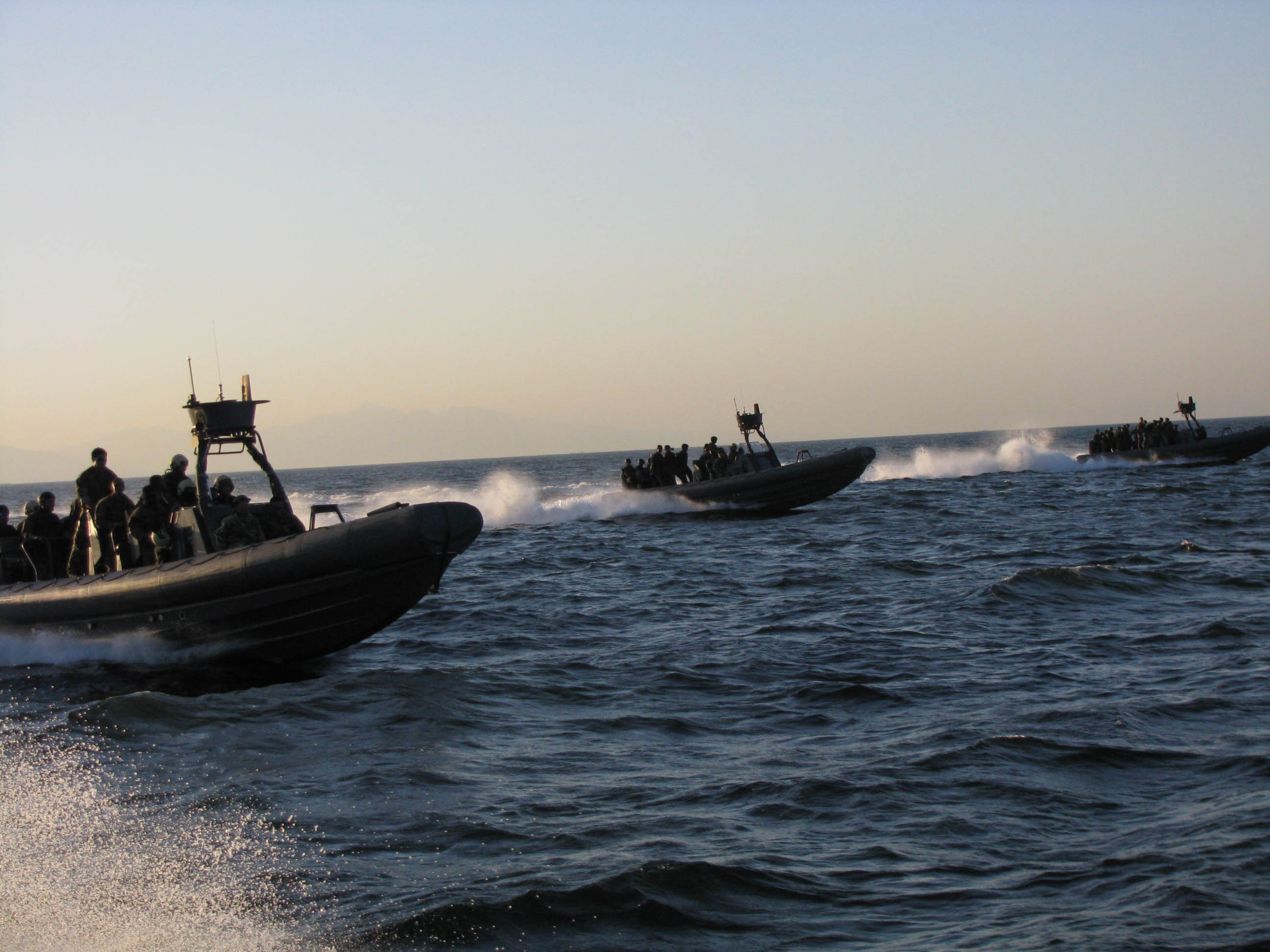
Philippine Navy rigid hull inflatable boats perform a maritime interdiction operation exercise in Manila Bay.

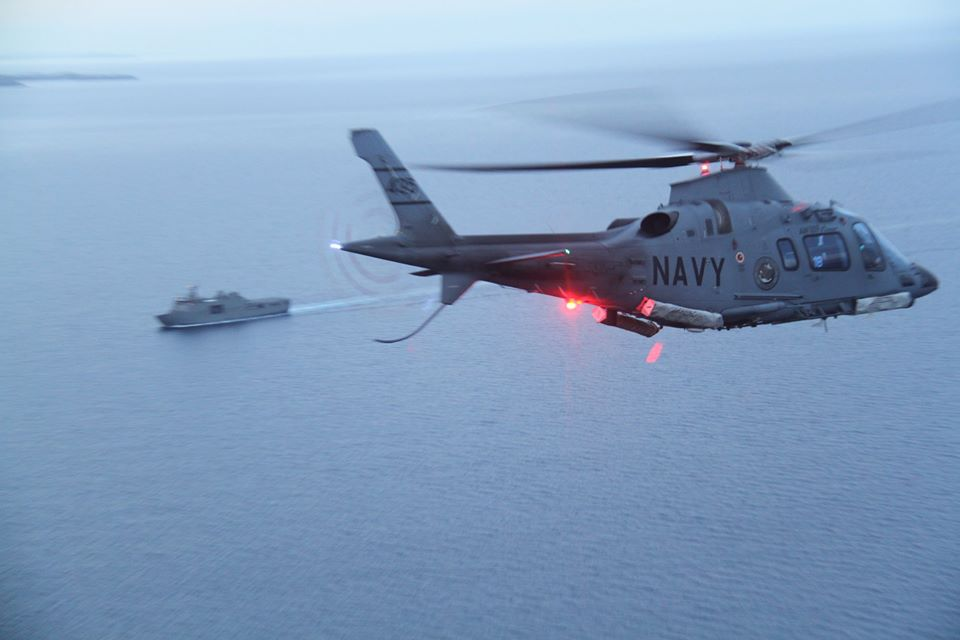
An AW109E naval helicopter approaches one of the Philippine Navy's Tarlac-class landing platform dock during an exercise in 2018

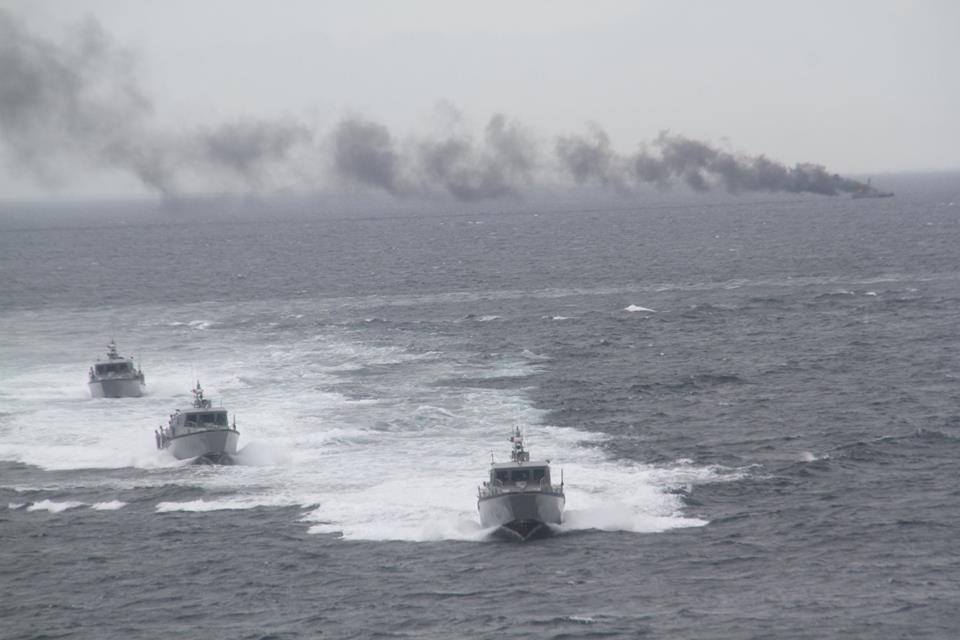
Missile-armed MPAC Mk. III attack boats during a live-fire demonstration involving the launching of Spike-ER missiles in November 2018

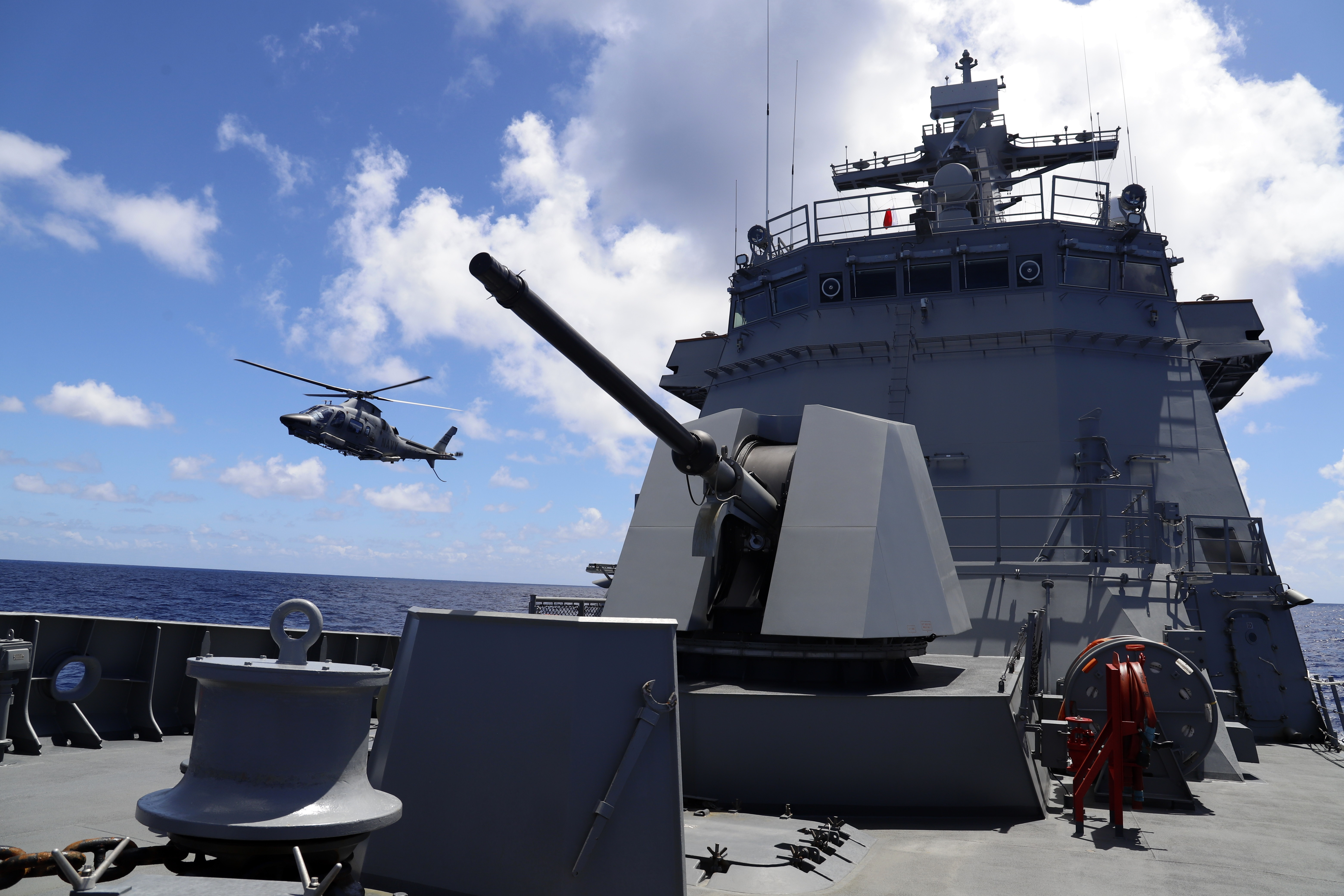
The BRP Jose Rizal (FF-150), along with an AW109E naval helicopter, conducting flight operations during the RIMPAC 2020

The Philippine Navy is administered through the Department of National Defense (DND). UnderChief of Staff of the Armed Forces of the Philippines (CSAFP), a four-star general/admiral (if the officer is a member of the Philippine Navy), is the most senior military officer. The senior naval officer is the Flag Officer-in-Command, Philippine Navy (FOIC, PN), who usually holds the rank of vice admiral. He, along with his or her Air Force and Army counterparts, is junior only to the CSAFP. The FOIC, PN is solely responsible for the administration and operational status of the Navy. His counterpart in the U.S. Navy is the Chief of Naval Operations.

Currently, the Navy establishment is actually composed of four type commands, the Philippine Fleet, the Philippine Marine Corps (PMC), the Special Warfare Force, and the Air Warfare Force. It is further organized into seven naval operational commands, five naval support commands, and nine naval support units. Considering the vastness of the territorial waters that the Navy has to protect and defend, optimal deployment of naval resources is achieved through identification of suitable locations where the presence of these units is capable of delivering responsive services.

The Philippine Fleet is under the direct command of the Commander, Philippine Fleet (C, PF), while the Marine Corps is answerable to the Commandant, PMC (CPMC), both of which are subordinate to the FOIC, PN.

=== Leadership ===
- Commander-in-Chief: President Ferdinand Romualdez Marcos, Jr.
- Secretary of National Defense: Secretary Gilberto C. Teodoro
- National Security Adviser: Secretary Eduardo S. Oban, Jr.
- Chief of Staff of the Armed Forces of the Philippines: General Antonio G. Nafarette, PA
- Flag Officer-in-Command of the Philippine Navy: Vice Admiral Alan M. Javier, PN
  - Commander, Philippine Fleet: Rear Admiral Raul A. Regis, PN
  - Commandant, Philippine Marine Corps: Brigadier General Bob R. Apostol, PN(M)
  - The Naval Inspector General: Rear Admiral Emilio G. Orio, PN

=== Naval Type Commands ===
- Philippine Fleet (PHILFLEET or PF; Lakas Dagatnin ng Pilipinas)
  - Offshore Combat Force (OCF) - responsible for the overall offshore combat, maritime patrol and territorial defense missions.
  - Littoral Combat Force (LCF) - responsible for the overall coastal defense, littoral patrol and interdiction missions.
  - Sealift Amphibious Force (SAF) - responsible for the overall naval sealift, amphibious deployment, and transport missions.
  - Fleet Support Group (FSG) - responsible for the overall fleet support missions.
  - Submarine Group (SG) - responsible for future submarine and underwater operations, including training, doctrine development, and overall maritime submarine strategies of the Navy.
  - Fleet Training and Doctrines Center (FTDC) - responsible for the overall training, education and doctrine development for the newly enlisted and ranked members of the Navy.
- Philippine Marine Corps (PMC; Hukbong Kawal Pandagat ng Pilipinas) - the primary naval infantry, combined arms, and amphibious landing force of the Navy.
- Naval Special Warfare Force (SWF, PN) (formerly the Naval Special Operations Command/NAVSOCOM) - responsible for naval special operations. The unit was separated from the PF and is now a standalone command as of 2020.
- Air Warfare Force (AWF, PN) - responsible for overall aerial reconnaissance and maritime patrol operations, as well as air support and future anti-submarine operations.

=== Naval Operational Commands ===
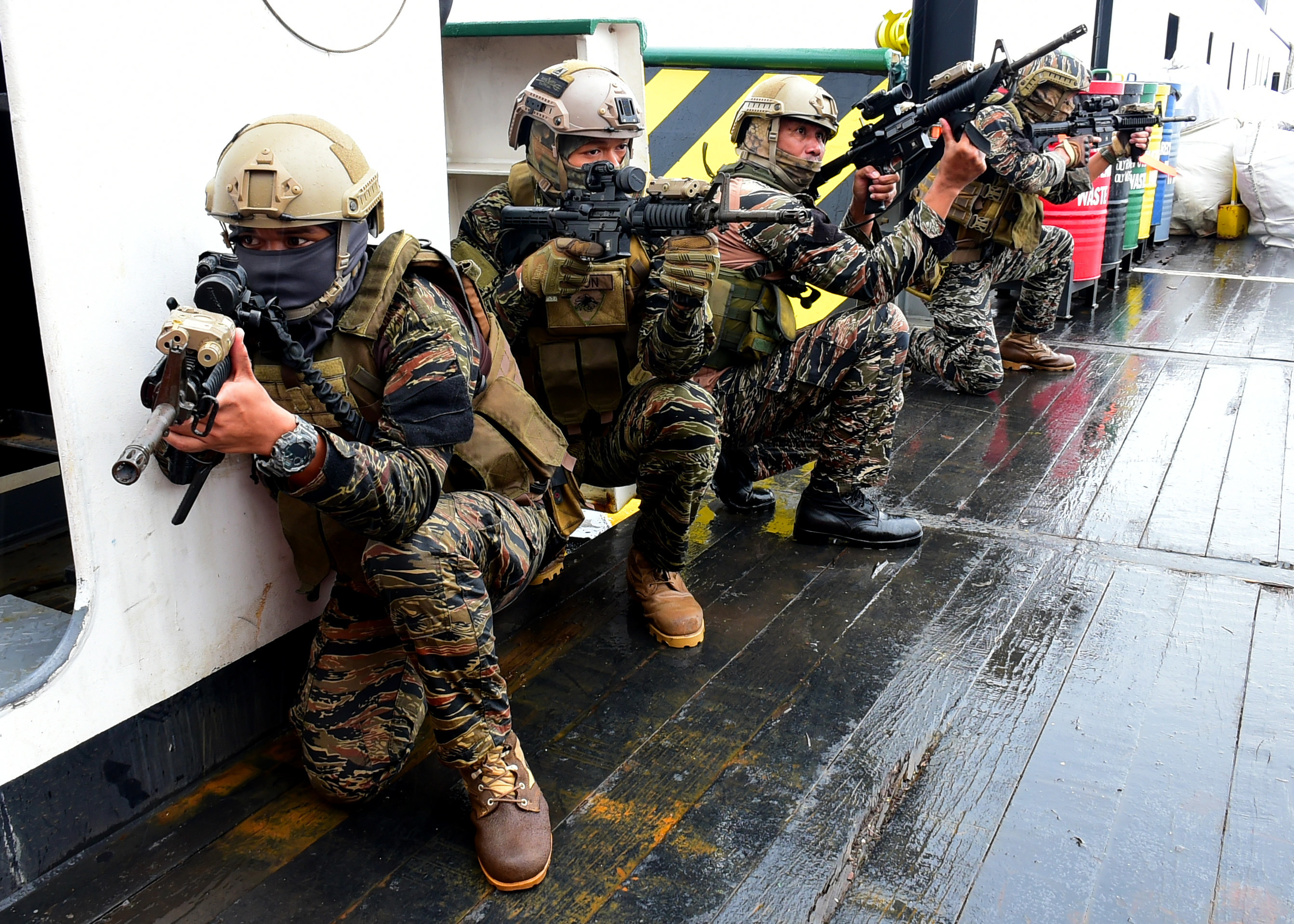
Philippine Navy SEALs at the SEACAT 2018 Exercise 002

The Naval Operation Commands are responsible for overall naval and maritime operations, which are divided into seven commands throughout the country, and as follows:

- Northern Luzon Naval Command (NCNL), formerly Naval Forces Northern Luzon (NAVFORNOL)
  - Commander: Rear Admiral Richard N Gonzaga, PN
- Naval Forces Southern Luzon (NFSL)
  - Commander: vacant
- Western Naval Command (NCW), formerly Naval Forces West (NAVFORWEST)
  - Commander: Rear Admiral Vincent J Sibala, PN
- Naval Forces Central (NFC)
  - Commander: Commodore Junjie Tabuada, PN
- Western Mindanao Naval Command (NCWM), formerly Naval Forces Western Mindanao (NAVFORWEM)
  - Commander: Rear Admiral Constancio Arturo M Reyes, Jr., PN
- Naval Forces Eastern Mindanao (NFEM)
  - Commander: Commodore Joel R. Tamayo, PN
- Naval Defense Command (NDC), formerly the Fleet-Marine Ready Force (FMRF)
  - Commander: Commodore Lued L Lincuna, PN

=== Naval Support Commands ===
The Naval Support Commands are responsible for the sustainability of naval and maritime operations, which are divided into five commands, and as follows:

==== Sea Systems Command, Philippine Navy ====
- Commander: Rear Admiral Juario C Marayag, PN

The Sea Systems Command, formerly known as Naval Sea Systems Command (NSSC) and Naval Support Command (NASCOM), provides quality and integrated naval system support and services in order to sustain the conduct of naval operations. It is the biggest industrial complex of the Armed Forces of the Philippines. It operates the country's military shipyards, develops new technologies for the Navy, and conducts maintenance on all the Navy's ships.

==== Education and Training Command, Philippine Navy ====
- Commander: Rear Admiral Karl A Decapia, PN

The Education and Training Command is the Philippine Navy's institution of higher learning. Its mission is to provide education and training to naval personnel so that they may be able to pursue progressive naval careers. The Naval Officer Candidate Course is under the jurisdiction of the command.

==== Naval Reserve Command (RESCOM, PN) ====
- Commander: Commodore Estelito B Lagadia, PN

The Naval Reserve Command organizes, trains, and administers all naval reservists (which includes the Naval Reserve Officers Training Corps Units midshipmen and midshipwomen). It is responsible for recalling reservists to provide the PN the base for expansion to meet sudden spikes in military manpower demand, as for war, rebellion or natural disaster/calamities and to assist in the socio-economic development of the country. RESCOM, PN is presently based at Naval Base Heracleo Alano, in Cavite City, having been provided its own building there after relocating from its former base at Fort Santiago, Manila.

==== Naval Combat Engineer Brigade (NCEBde) ====
- Commander: Commodore Jeff Rene S Nadugo, PN

The Naval Combat Engineer Brigade, more popularly known as the Seabees (patterned after their US Navy counterparts), is tasked with combat engineering and amphibious construction in support of Fleet-Marine operations. Naval combat engineers perform tasks such as mobility, counter-mobility, assault, survivability and construction in the conduct of ground combat and amphibious operations. Living up to its motto of "We build, we fight!", and their homage to their US Navy counterparts of "Can do!", NCEBde executes under combat conditions the construction of roads, bridges and other vital infrastructures; the rehabilitation of piers, harbors and beach facilities; and harbor clearing and salvage works. Alongside the Philippine Marine Corps, the NCEBde is charged with the manning and security of naval garrisons in the contested shoals and islands claimed by the Philippines in the South China Sea.

==== Installation Management Command (IMC, PN) ====
- Commander: Rear Admiral Peter Jempsun V De Guzman, PN

The Installation Management Command, formerly the Naval Installation Command (NIC/Naval Base Cavite), provides support services to the Philippine Navy and other AFP tenant units in the base complex, such as refueling, re-watering, shore power connections, berthing, ferry services, tugboat assistance, sludge disposal services and housing.

=== Naval Support Units ===
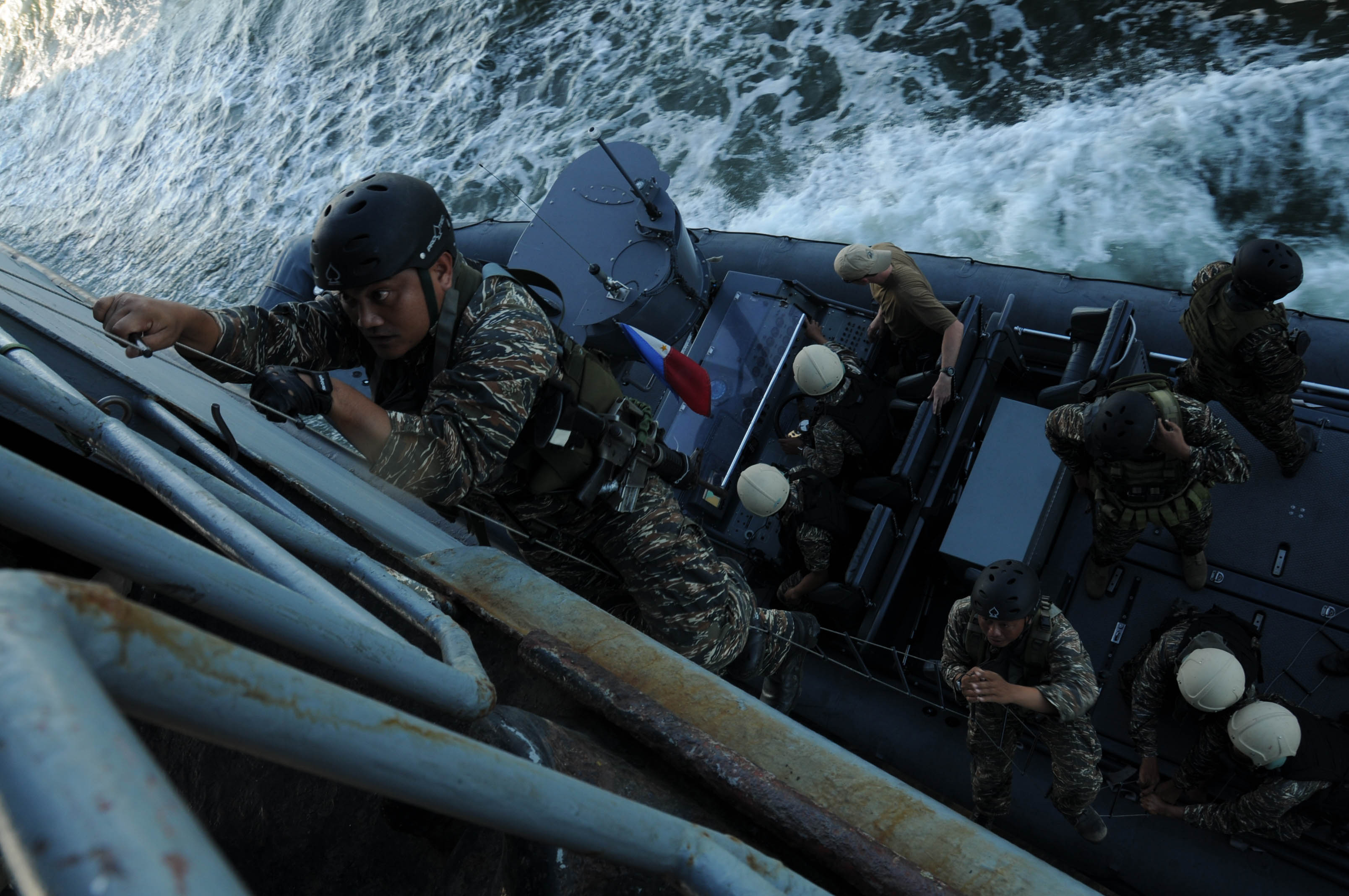
A Philippine Navy SEAL climbs a jacob's ladder aboard the logistics support vessel during a maritime interdiction operation exercise.

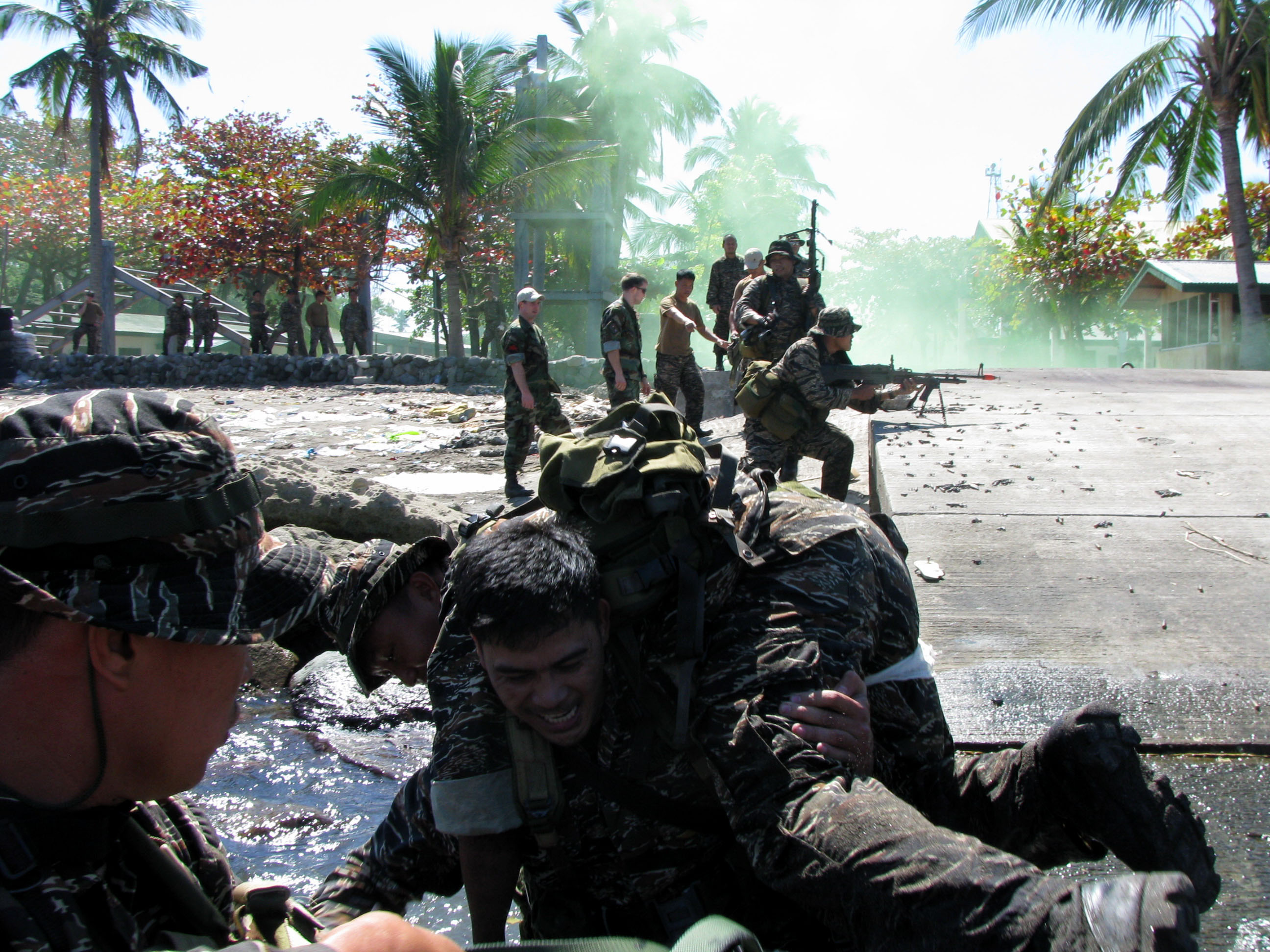
A Philippine Navy SEAL Team participates in a battlefield exercise during a capability demonstration at Naval Base Cavite.

The Naval Support Units are responsible for the overall support of the navy, which includes logistics, personnel, financial, management, civil-military operations, and health care services, which are divided into eight groups and as follows:

- Logistics Center (LC, PN)
  - Commander: Captain Perceeval O Buted, PN(GSC)
- Cyber Warfare Force (CWF, PN; formerly the Naval Information and Communication Technology Center/NICTC)
  - Commander: Captain John B Montes, PN(GSC)
- Intelligence and Security Force (ISF, PN)
  - Commander: Commodore Jerry Garido, Jr., PN
- Personnel Management Center (PMC, PN)
  - Commander: Captain Elvira Gonzales, PN(GSC)
- Ammunition and Explosives Center (AEC, PN)
  - Commander: Captain Jirreh C Castillon, PN(GSC)
- Civil Military Operations Group - Philippine Navy (CMOG - PN)
  - Commander: Colonel Fidel I Macatangay, PN(M)(GSC)
- Finance Center (FC, PN)
  - Commander: Captain Fred R Correo, PN(GSC)
- Navy Meteorological and Oceanographic Center (NAVMETOC)
  - Commander: Captain Rommel Marcello R Panol, PN(GSC)

== Rank structure ==
=== Officers ===
Rank group	General / flag officers				Senior officers			Junior officers
Philippine Navy
Philippine Navy	Admiral	Vice admiral	Rear admiral	Commodore	Captain	Commander	Lieutenant commander	Lieutenant	Lieutenant junior grade	Ensign

=== Enlisted ===
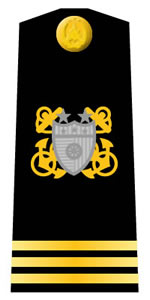
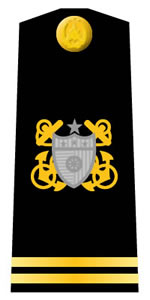
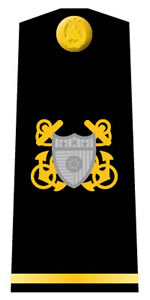
Rank group	Senior NCOs						Junior NCOs	Enlisted
Philippine Navy
Philippine Navy	Master chief petty officer	Senior chief petty officer	Chief petty officer	Petty officer, first class	Petty officer, second class	Petty officer, third class	Seaman first class	Seaman second class	Apprentice seaman

== Equipment ==
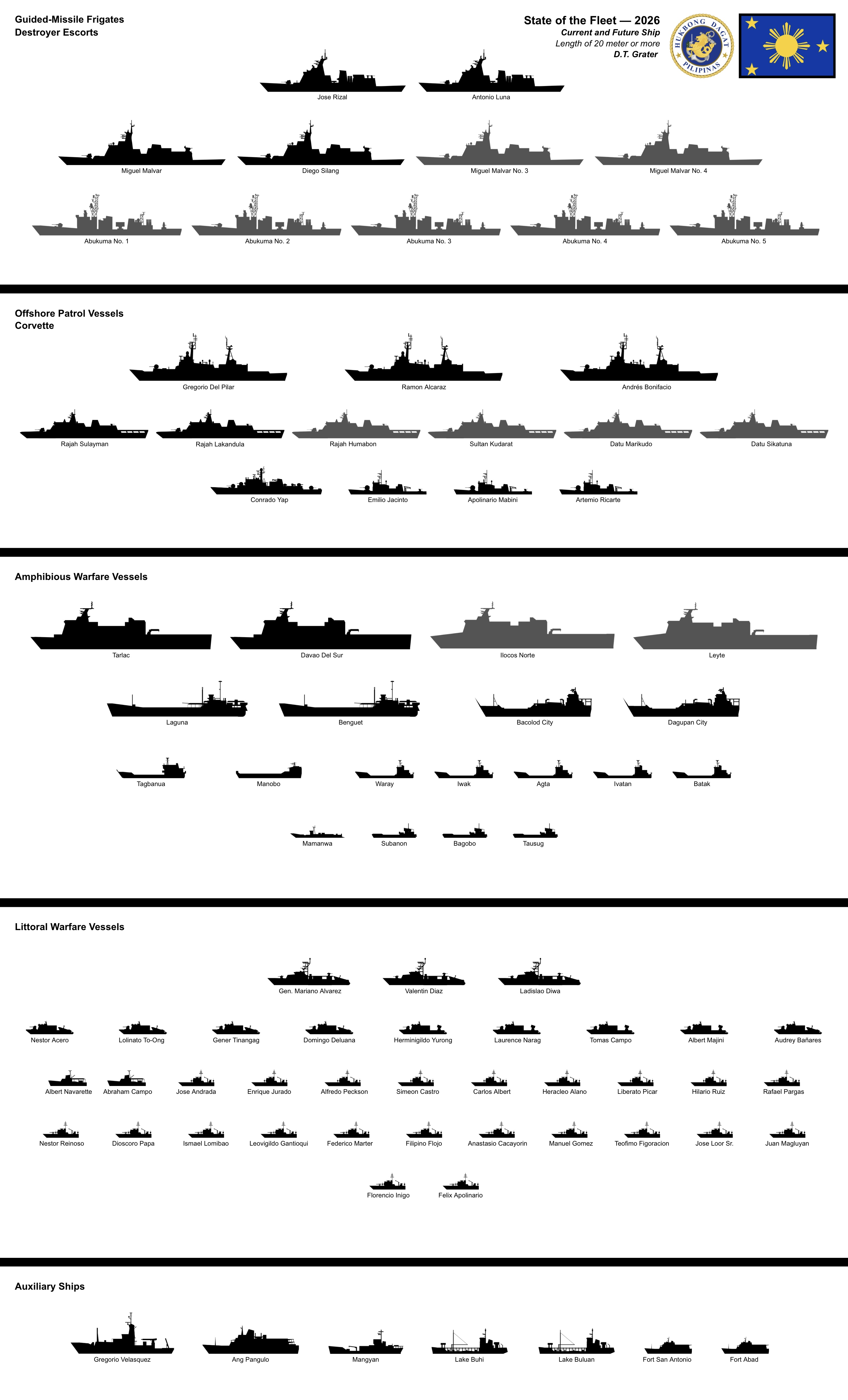
Silhouettes of 20 meters or above ships of the Philippine Navy (Current and Future).

=== Vessels ===
The names of commissioned ships of the Philippine Navy are prefixed with the letters "BRP", designating "Barko ng Republika ng Pilipinas" (Ship of the Republic of the Philippines). The names of ships are often selected to honor important people and places. The Philippine Navy is currently operating 96 combat vessels and 21 support vessels as listed per category below:

Offshore Combatants

- Frigates: 4 (+2)
- Destroyer escorts 0 (+5)
- Corvettes: 1 (+1)
- Offshore patrol vessels: 8 (+4)

Littoral Combatants (coastal-sea defense, marine land-assault boat-operations)

- Missile boats: 10 (Note: 4 Acero-class FAIC-M + 6 Mk.3 MPAC. Assault-range SSMs.)
- Fast attack craft: 42 (Note: 3 Alvarez-class + 4 Acero-class FAIC (FFBNW SSMs) + 3 Mk.1 MPAC + 3 Mk.2 MPAC + 22 Andrada-class + 2 ex-USN PCF Mk.3 Swift Boats + 4 Type-966Y. FACs are usually 25+ knots. Here, MPAC Mk.2 is the fastest at 45kn / 83kph, while slowest is Andrada-class at 28kn / 52 kph. Their speed also makes them as PBFs (patrol boats fast), chasing armed civilian boats, among other speedy law-enforcement work; and as marine corps fast-transport and fast-response vessels in nearshore and riverine ops.) (+4)
- Patrol boats: 4 (Note: 2 Kagitingan-class + 2 Navarette-class (ex-Point-class cutters). They are 21kn and 17kn respectively, used mainly on harbor security, among other non-speed tasks.)

Amphibious Combatants

- Landing Platforms, Dock: 2 (+2)
- Landing ships, tank / Logistics support vessels: 5
- Landing craft utility: 20

Support Vessels

- Auxiliary ships: 16
- Miscellaneous vessels: 5

=== Aircraft ===
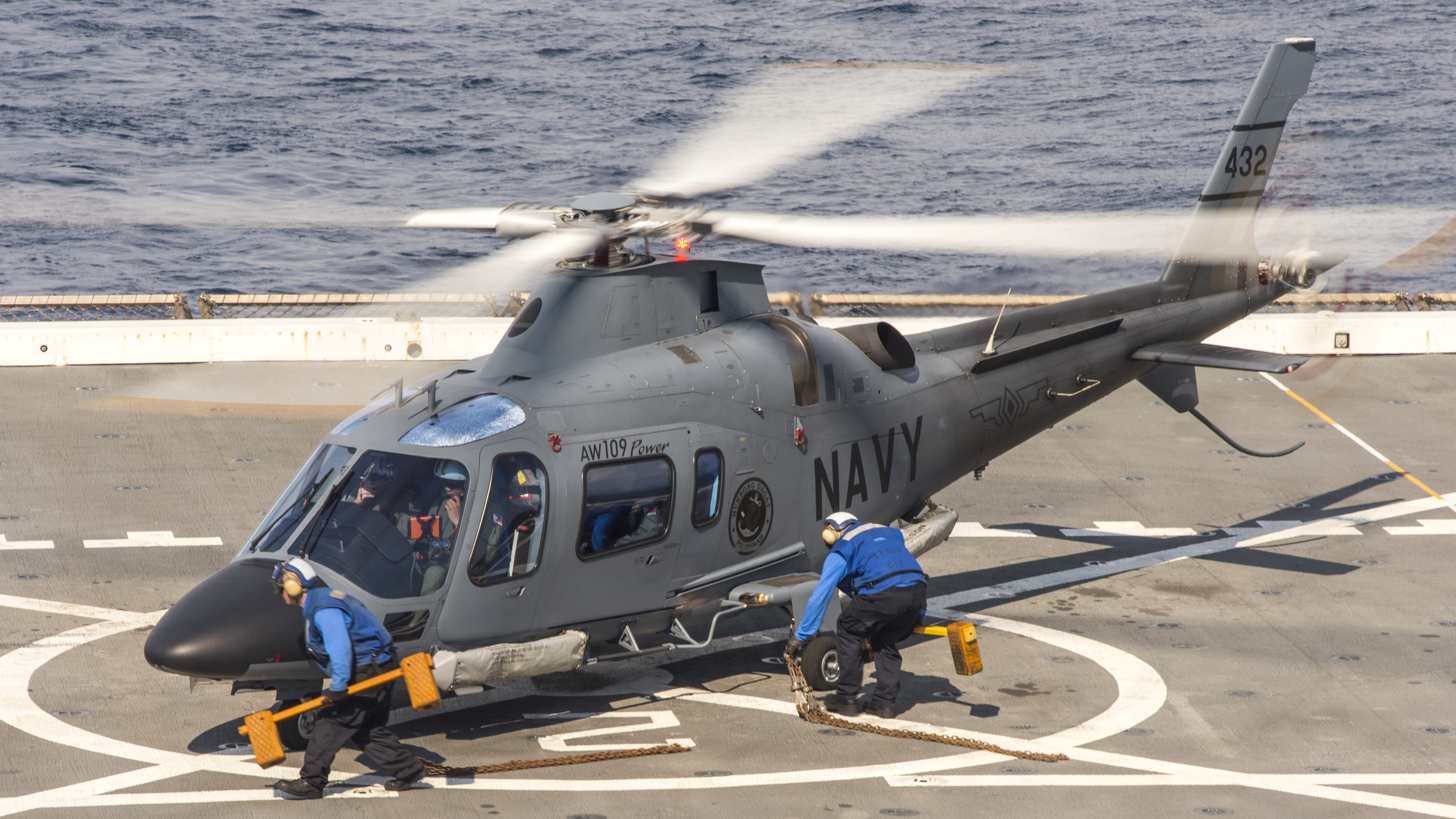
Philippine Navy AW109 during flight operations aboard the USS Green Bay.

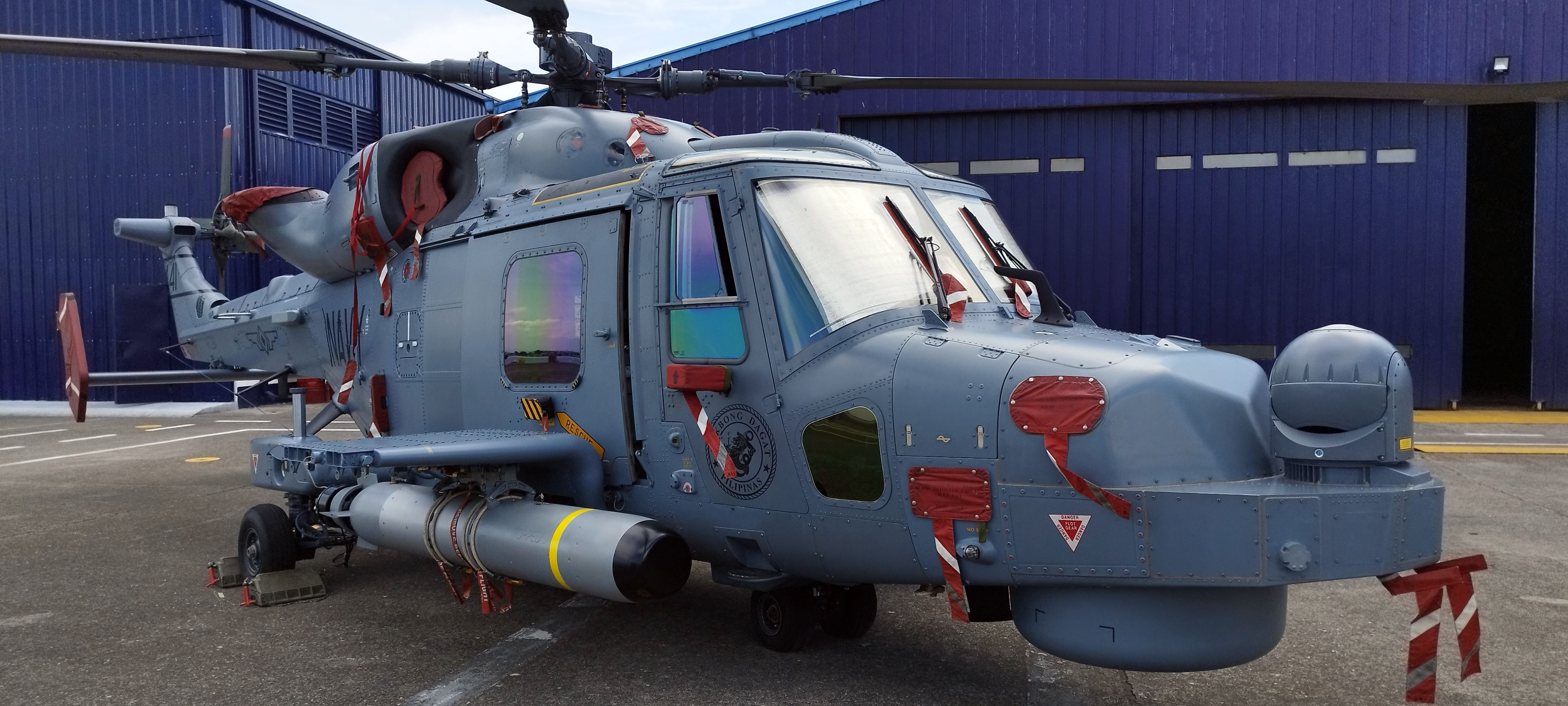
AW159 Wildcat helicopter of the Philippine Navy (PN) armed with K745 Blue Shark torpedoes taken at the Philippine Fleet Defense Expo (PFDX) 2023

The Air Warfare Force (AWF, PN) has 34 naval air assets consisting of 26 manned aircraft and 8 unmanned aerial vehicles (UAVs). It prepares and provides these forces for naval operations with assets mainly for maritime reconnaissance and support missions.

==== Air Warfare Force Units ====
Flying Units:

- 30th Naval Fixed Wing Air Group 30 (BN-2A Islander)
  - 31st Light Utility Patrol Squadron
  - 32nd Maritime Patrol & Reconnaissance Squadron (Beechcraft King Air C-90)
- 40th Naval Helicopter Air Group 40 (Leonardo AW159 Wildcat, AgustaWestland AW109E Power, and MBB Bo 105C)
  - 41st Maritime Strike Helicopter Squadron
  - 42nd Anti Submarine Helicopter Squadron
- 71st Maritime Unmanned Aerial Reconnaissance Squadron (Boeing Insitu ScanEagle)

Non-Flying Units:

- 21st Group Support Squadron
- Naval Air Warfare Training and Doctrine Center (Cessna Skyhawk 172M and Robinson R22 Beta II)
- Aircraft Inspection & Maintenance Squadron
- 62nd Air Combat Systems Squadron
- 63rd Ordnance and Material Supply Squadron

== Logs of Equipment Acquisition ==
Vessels

- 2025 December 26 : contract signed for two additional Hyundai frigates which is a repeat order of the Miguel Malvar-class frigates.
- 2025 July 6 : confirmed transfer for six second-hand Abukuma-class destroyer-escorts in a formalized agreement during 2025 June meeting in Singapore between Japan's defense minister Gen Nakatani and Philippine defense secretary Gilberto Teodoro.
  - 2025 October 8 : PH Navy revised to only acquire 3 Abukuma.
  - 2026 July 7 : acquisition again revised to 5 units from a general agreement by Japan and the Philippines.
- 2023 May 2 : US announced the transfer of 4 ex-USCG fast boats.
- 2023 March 28 : +2 Cyclone-class fast attack vessels to-be-transferred as revealed by the US Navy 5th Fleet in Manama, Bahrain. The offer was originally way back in 2021.
  - Commissioning same year 2023
- 2022 June 27 : contract signed for six HDP-2400 offshore patrol vessels.
  - officially commissioned as Rajah Sulayman class OPVs.
- 2022 June 24 : contract signed for two additional LPDs, enhanced version from the earlier Tarlac-class LPDs.
- 2021 December 28 : Corvette Acquisition Project contract signed for two HDC-3100 corvettes (Note: During the corvettes' construction, PH Navy assigned them with the pennant code "FF" (frigate), then later "FFG (guided missile frigate).)
  - officially commissioned as Miguel Malvar-class frigates.
- 2021 November 24 : officially revealed the planned transfer of 2nd Pohang-class corvette ex-ROKS Andong.
  - Status: delayed or uncertain or scrapped
- 2021 February 9 : contract signed for 8+1 Shaldag Mk.V orders.
  - 2024 Sept 17 : batch-4 (hulls 7 & 8). They are also the 3rd & 4th boats preinstalled with 8 Spike NLOS antiship missiles.

== Bases ==
Name	Location		Description
Naval Bases
Naval Base Heracleo Alano (Naval Base Cavite)	Cavite City	Luzon	Headquarters, PF Headquarters, RESCOM, PN Headquarters, AWF, PN Headquarters, SWF, PN Headquarters, NDC, PN Headquarters, IMC, PN
Naval Base Camilo Osias (Naval Base San Vicente)	Santa Ana, Cagayan	Luzon	
Naval Base Subic	Subic, Zambales	Luzon	
Naval Base Rafael Ramos (Naval Base Mactan)	Looc, Lapu-Lapu City, Cebu	Visayas	Headquarters, NFC
Naval Station
Naval Station Jose Andrada (Fort San Antonio Abad)	Manila	NCR	GHQ, PN
Naval Station Jose Francisco (Bonifacio Naval Station)	Taguig	NCR	Part of it was developed as Bonifacio Global City
Naval Station Heracleo Alano (Sangley Point)	Cavite City	Luzon	
Naval Station Pascual Ledesma (Fort San Felipe)	Cavite City	Luzon	
Naval Station Ernesto Ogbinar (Naval Station Poro Point)	Poro Point, San Fernando, La Union	Luzon	Headquarters, NCNL
Naval Station Leovigildo Gantioqui (Naval Station San Miguel)	San Antonio, Zambales	Luzon	Headquarters, NETDC
Naval Station Narciso Del Rosario (Naval Station Balabac)	Balabac Island, Palawan	Luzon	
Naval Station Emilio Liwanag (Naval Station Pag-asa)	Kalayaan Islands, Palawan	Luzon	
Naval Station Apolinario Jalandoon (Naval Station Puerto Princesa)	Puerto Princesa, Palawan	Luzon	Headquarters, NCW
Naval Station Carlito Cunanan (Naval Station Ulugan)	Puerto Princesa, Palawan	Luzon	
Naval Station Julhasan Arasain (Naval Station Legazpi)	Rawis, Legazpi, Albay	Luzon	Headquarters, NFSL
Naval Station Alfonso Palencia (Naval Station Guimaras)	Guimaras	Visayas	
Naval Station Dioscoro Papa (Naval Station Tacloban)	Tacloban, Leyte	Visayas	
Naval Station Felix Apolinario (Naval Station Davao)	Panacan, Davao City	Mindanao	Headquarters, NFEM
Naval Station Romulo Espaldon (Naval Station Zamboanga)	Lower Calarian, Zamboanga City	Mindanao	Headquarters, NCWM
Naval Station Rio Hondo	Zamboanga City	Mindanao	
Naval Station Juan Magluyan (Naval Operating Base Batu-Batu)	Panglima Sugala, Tawi-Tawi	Mindanao	
Marine Bases
Marine Barracks Rudiardo Brown (Marine Base Manila)	Taguig	Luzon	GHQ, PMC
Marine Barracks Gregorio Lim (Marine Base Ternate)	Ternate, Cavite	Luzon	Contains the Marine Basic School Campus
Marine Barracks Arturo Asuncion (Marine Base Zamboanga)	Zamboanga City	Mindanao	
Marine Barracks Domingo Deluana (Marine Base Tawi-Tawi)	Tawi-Tawi	Mindanao	
Camp Gen. Teodulfo Bautista	Jolo, Sulu	Mindanao	

== Gallery ==
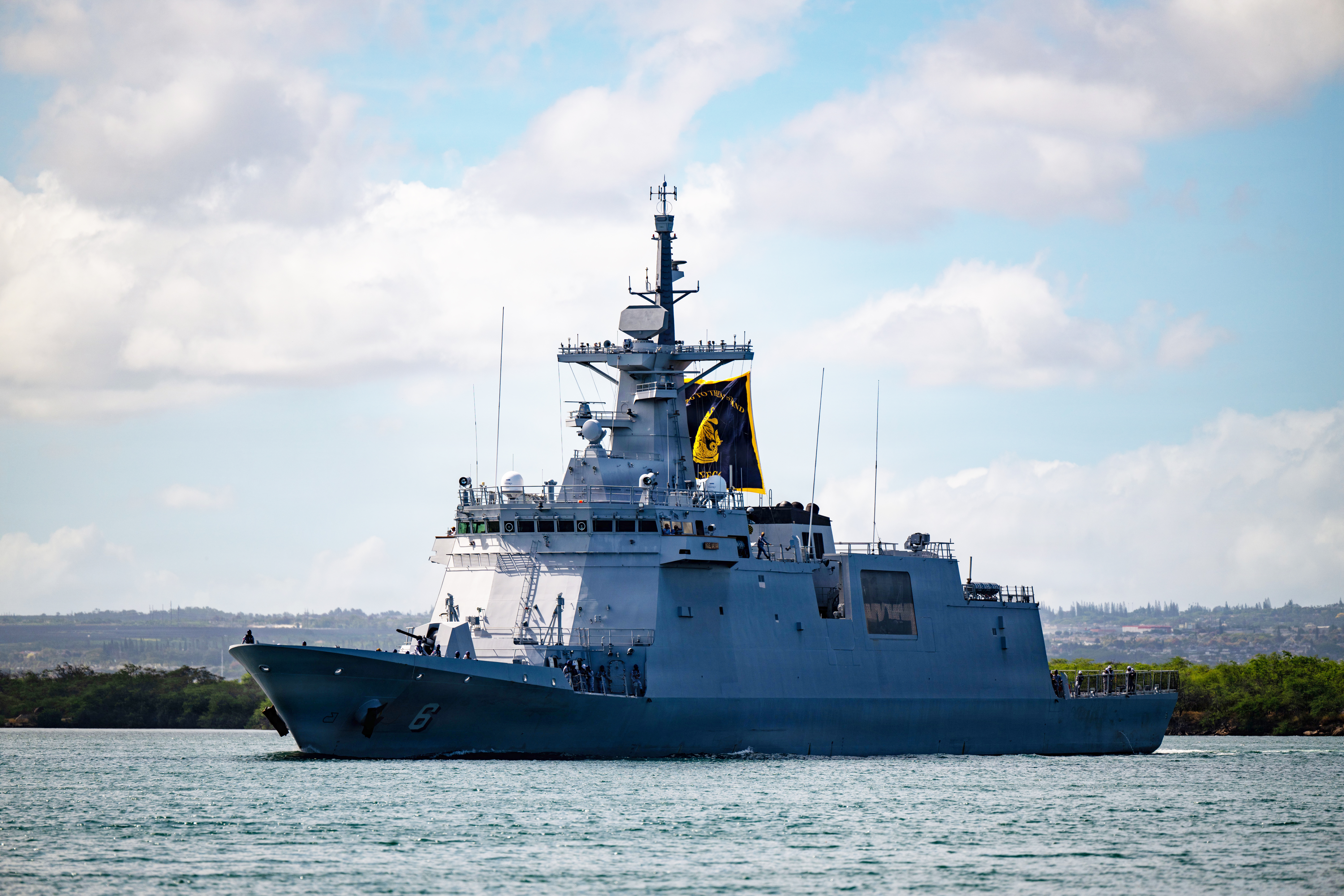
Philippine Navy BRP Miguel Malvar FFG-6

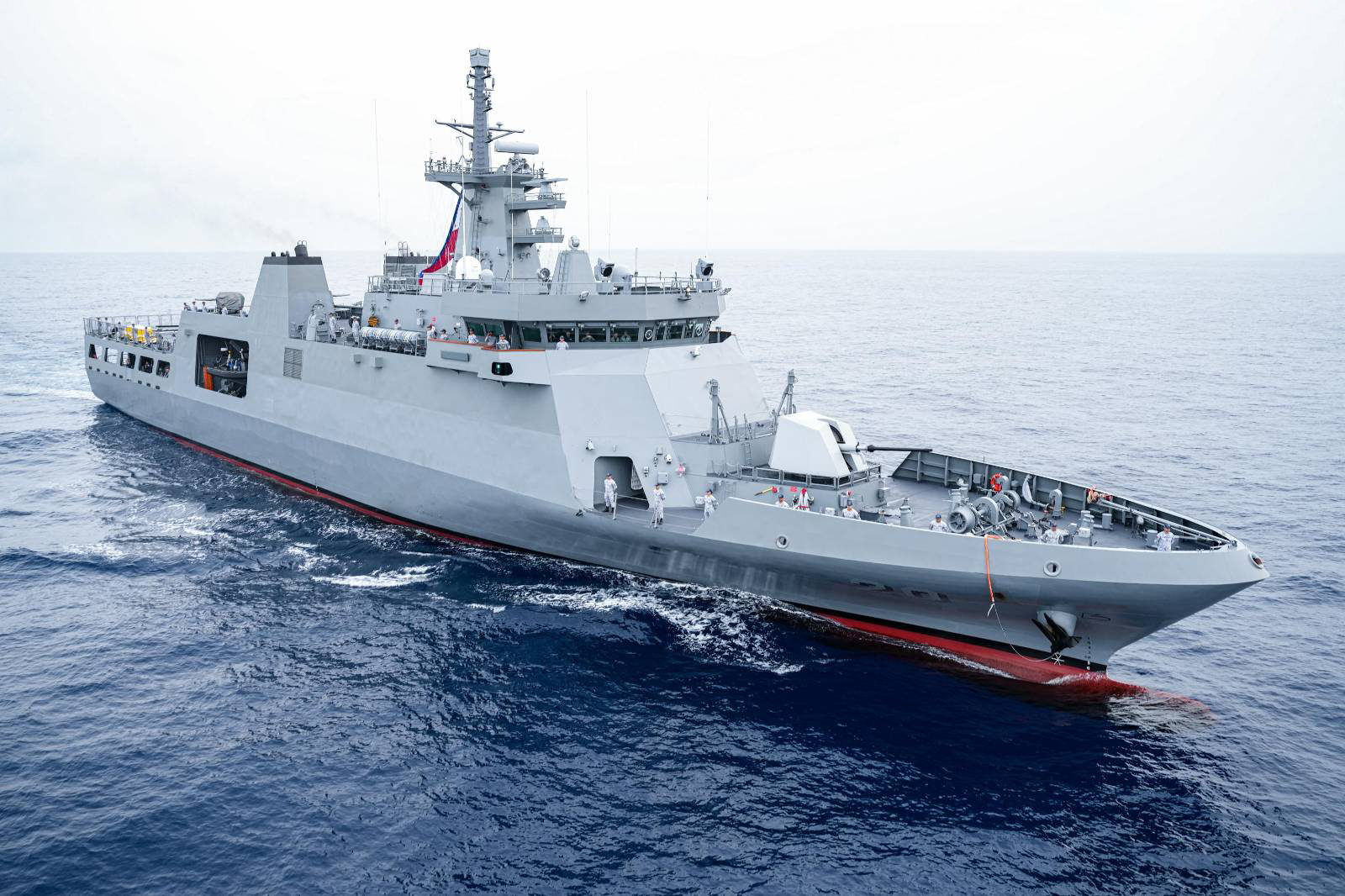
Philippine Navy BRP Rajah Sulayman PS-20

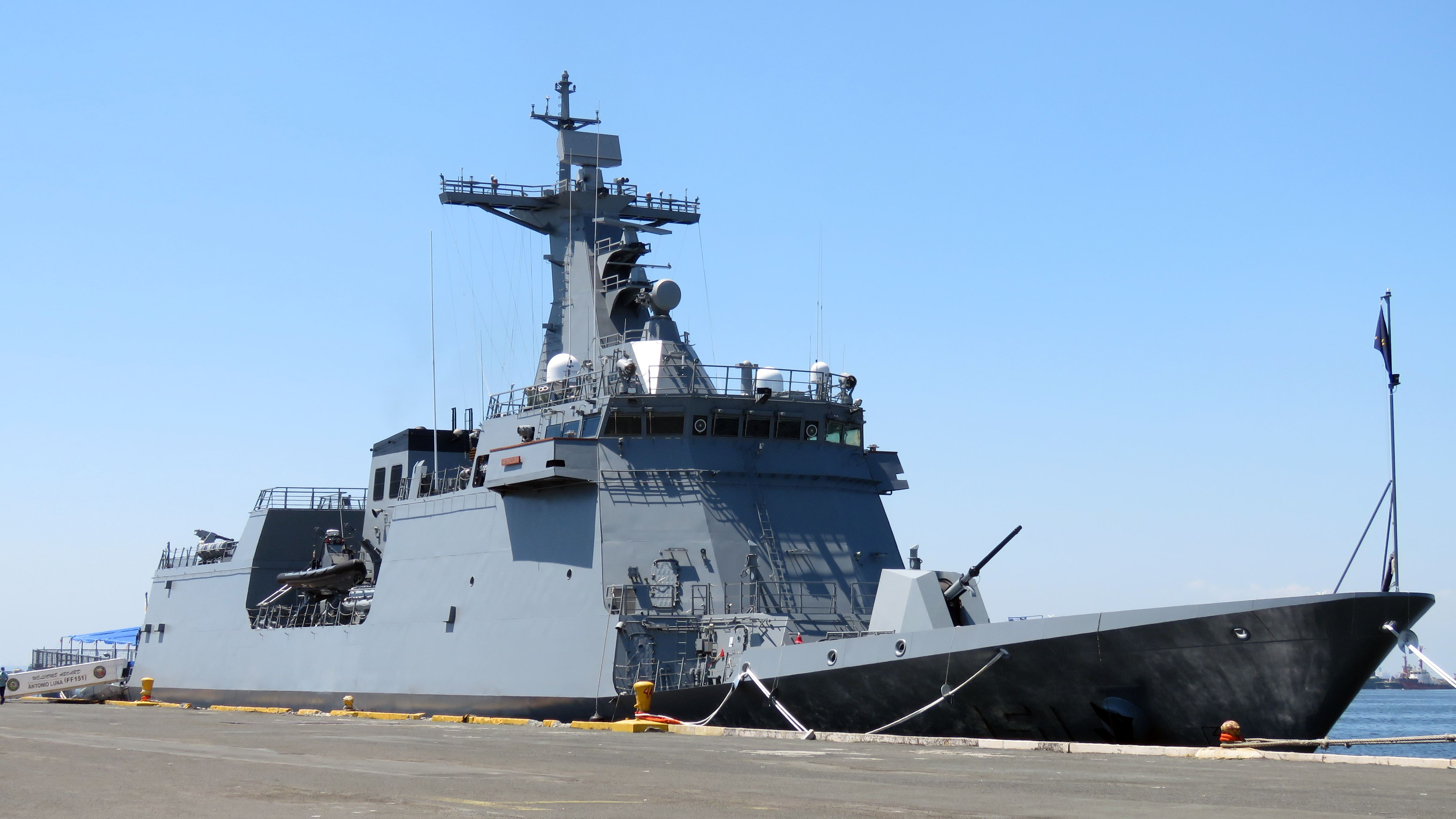
Frigate BRP Antonio Luna (FF-151) of the Philippine Navy

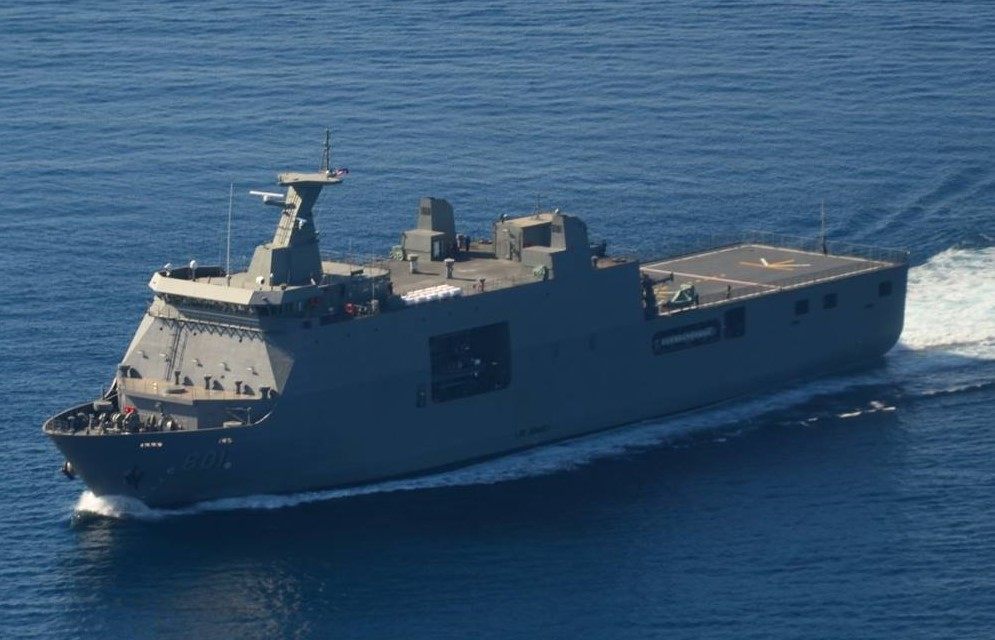
BRP Tarlac (LD-601) is the lead ship of landing platform docks of the Philippine Navy meant for amphibious operations and transport duties

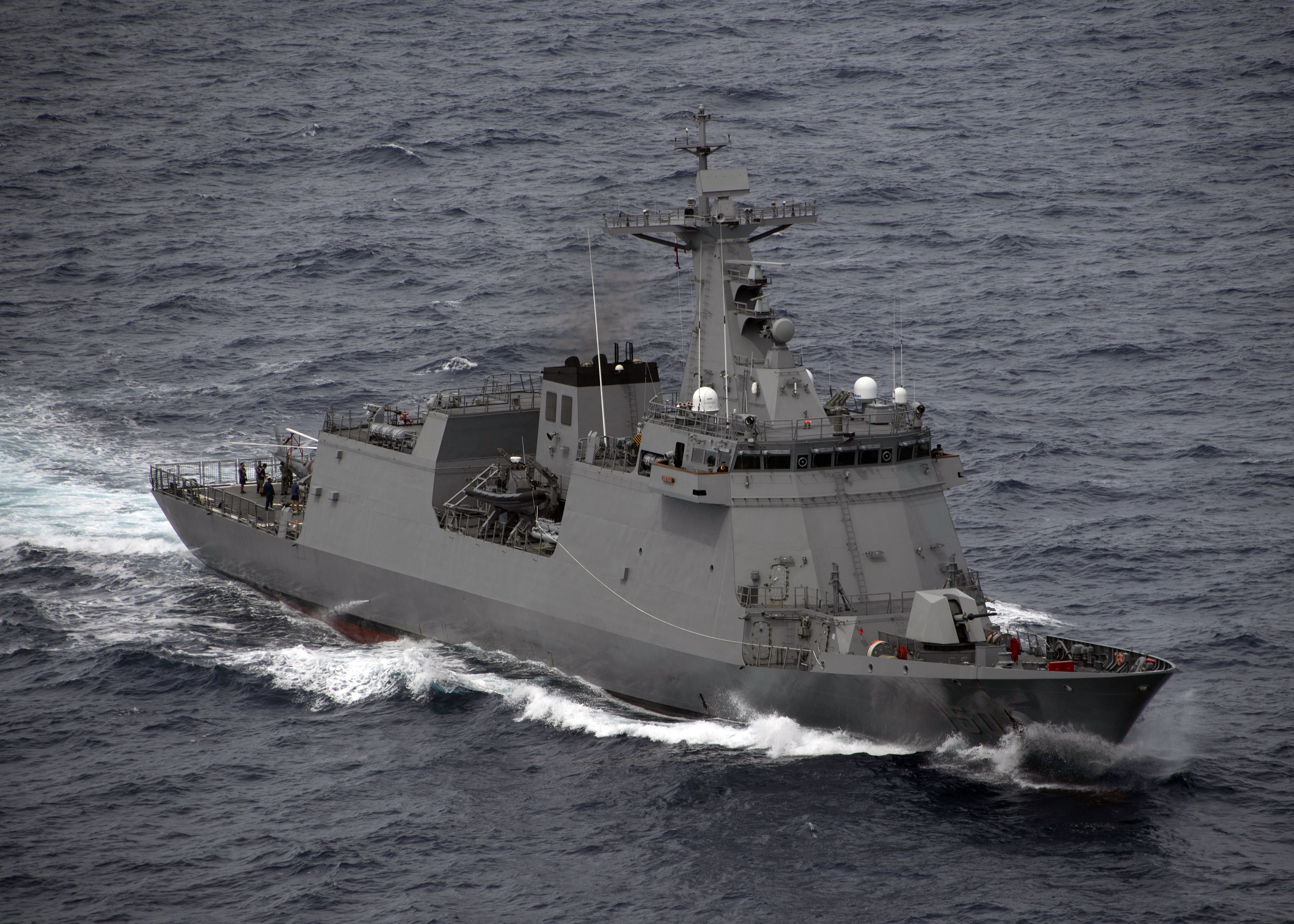
BRP Jose Rizal (FF-150) is the lead ship of her class of guided missile frigates of the Philippine Navy

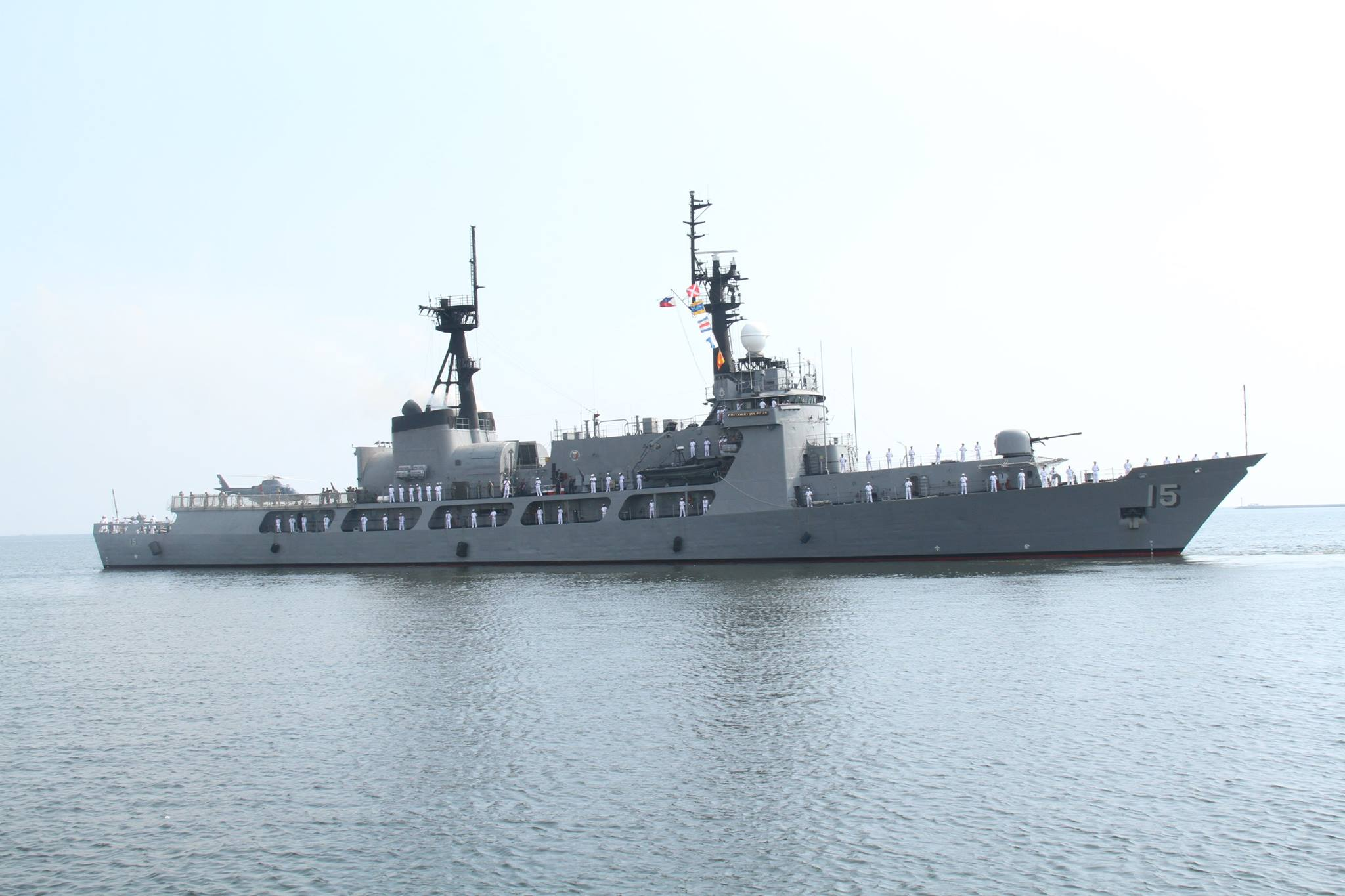
BRP Gregorio del Pilar (PS-15)

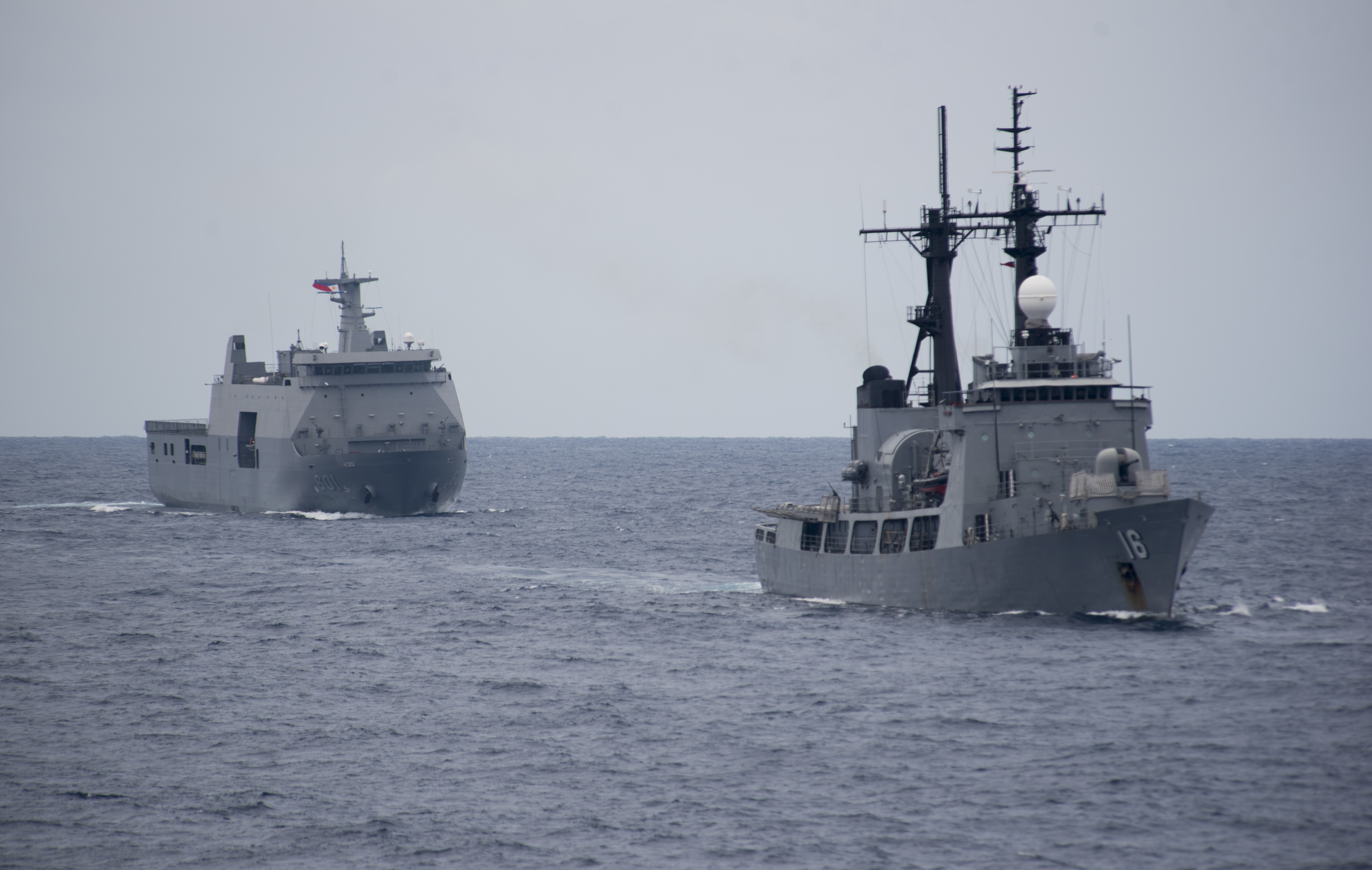
BRP Ramon Alcaraz (PS-16) and BRP Tarlac (LD-601) sail in formation during the at-sea portion of Maritime Training Activity (MTA) Sama Sama 2018.

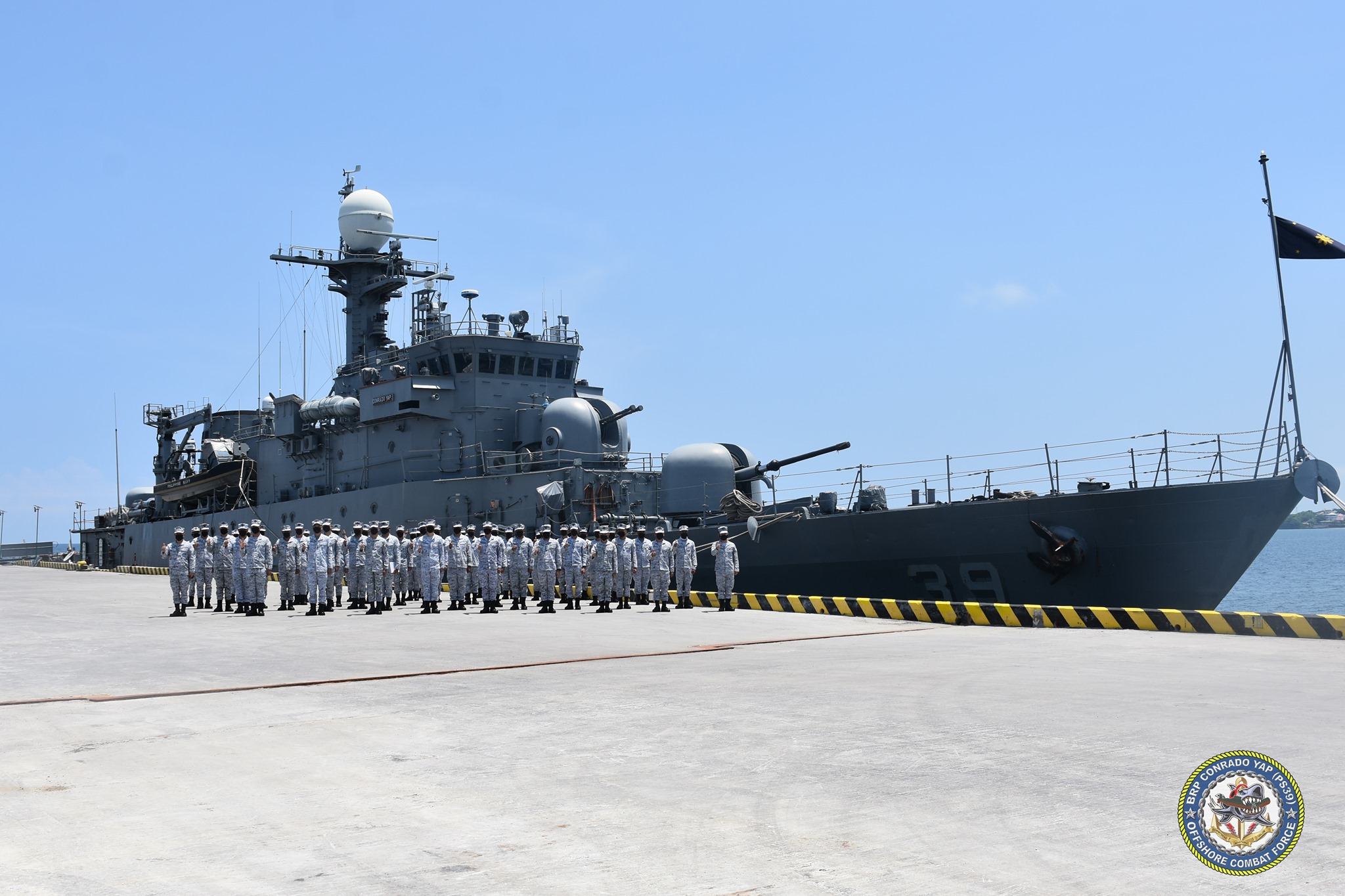
BRP Conrado Yap (PS-39)

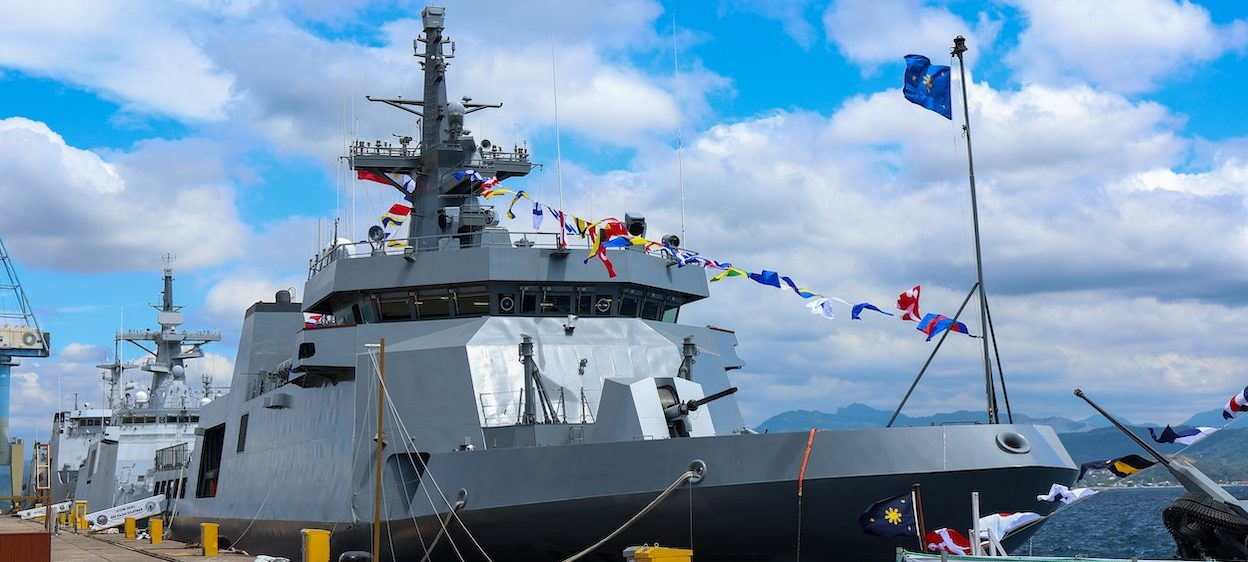
BRP Rajah Sulayman PS-20

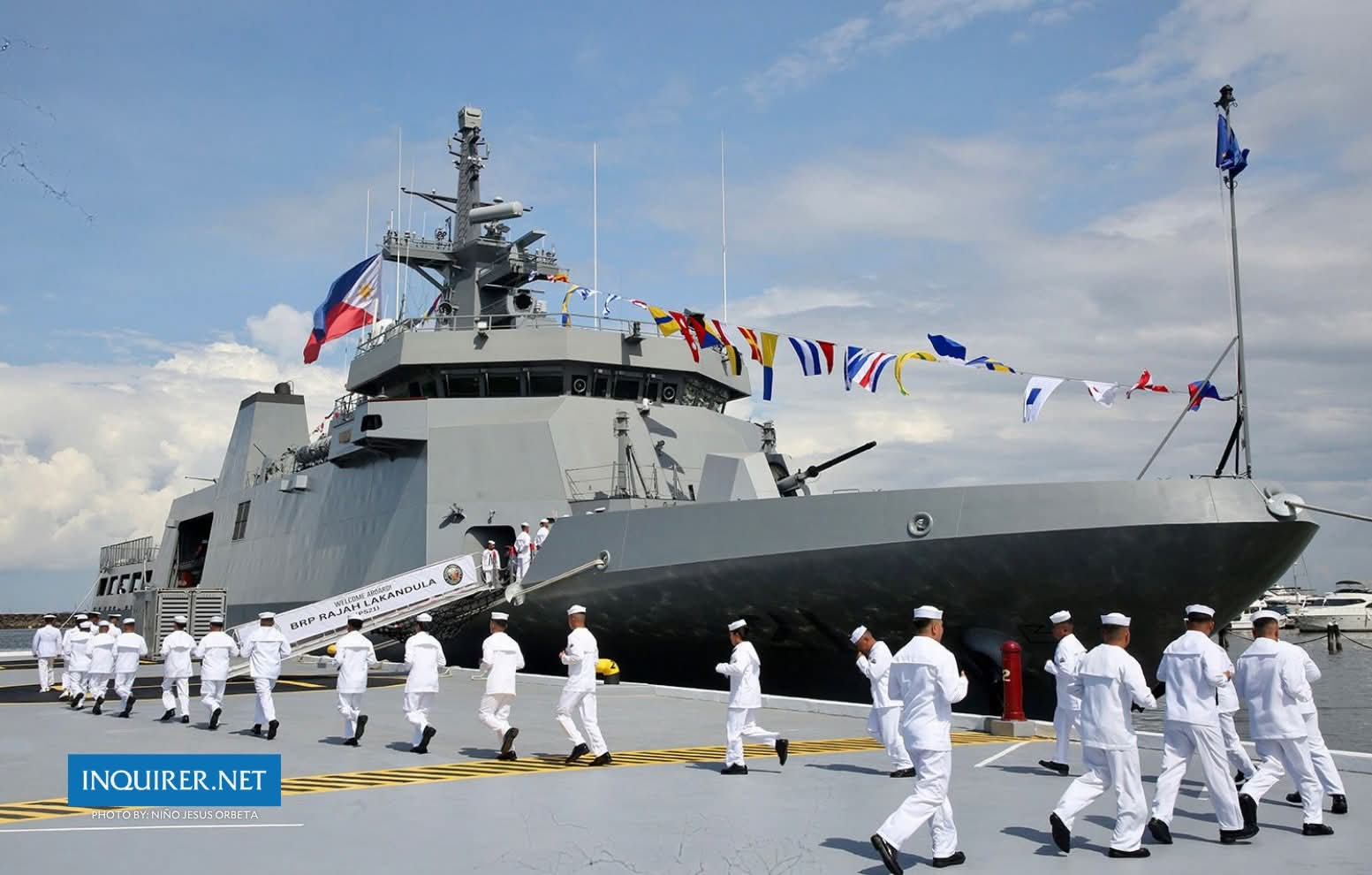
BRP Rajah lakandula PS-21

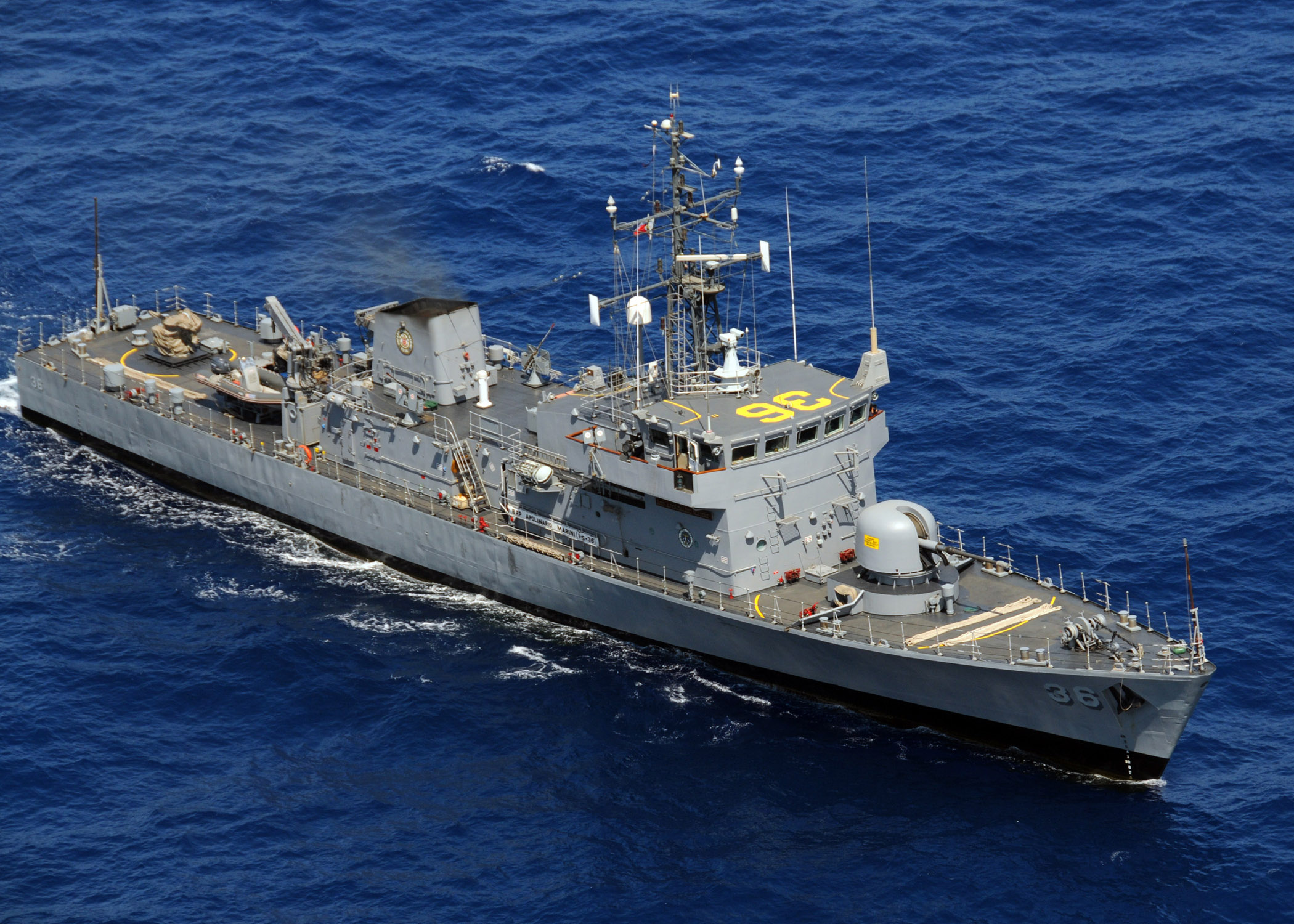
BRP Apolinario Mabini (PS-36)

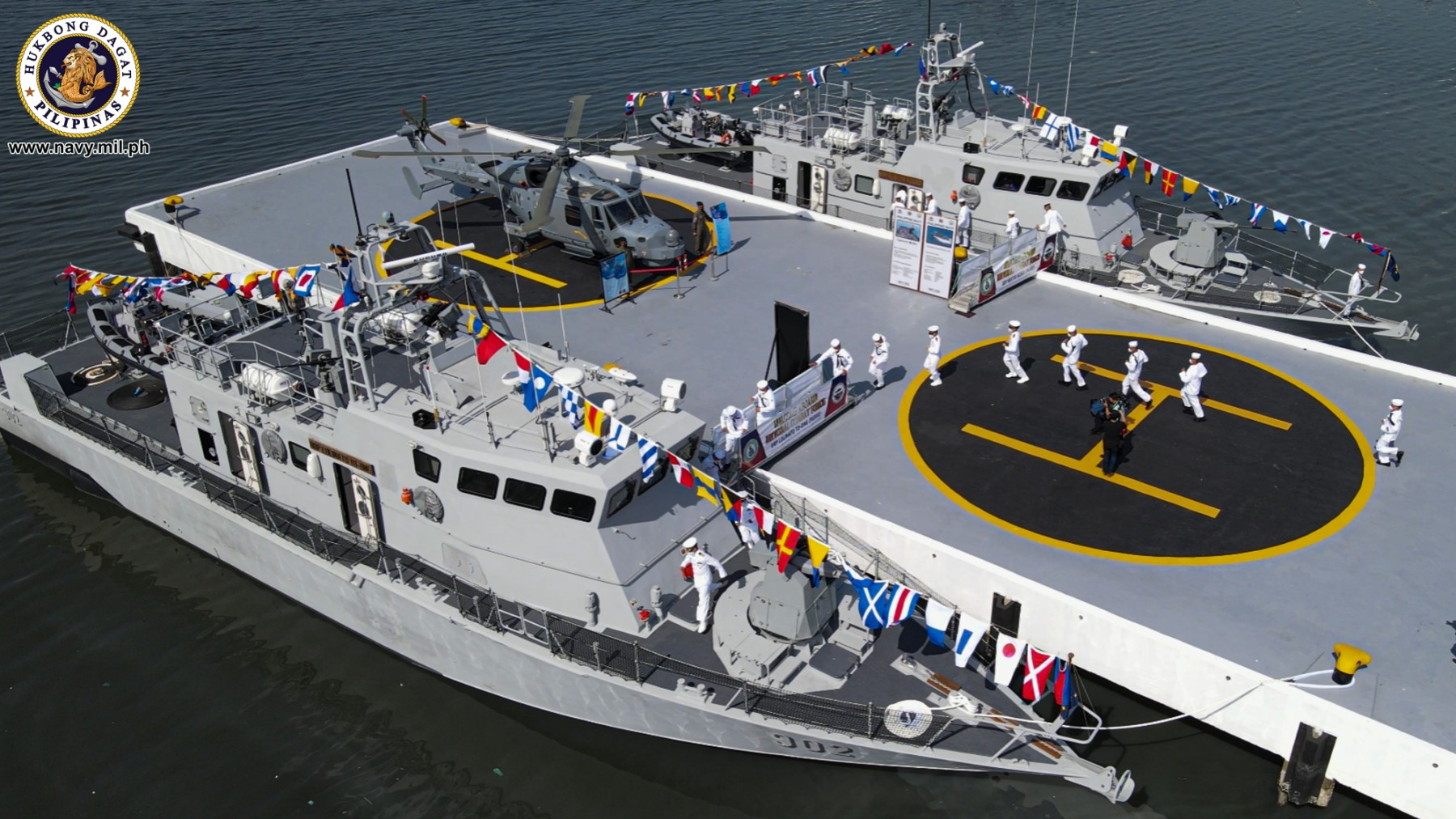
BRP Nestor Acero Fast Attack Interdiction Craft

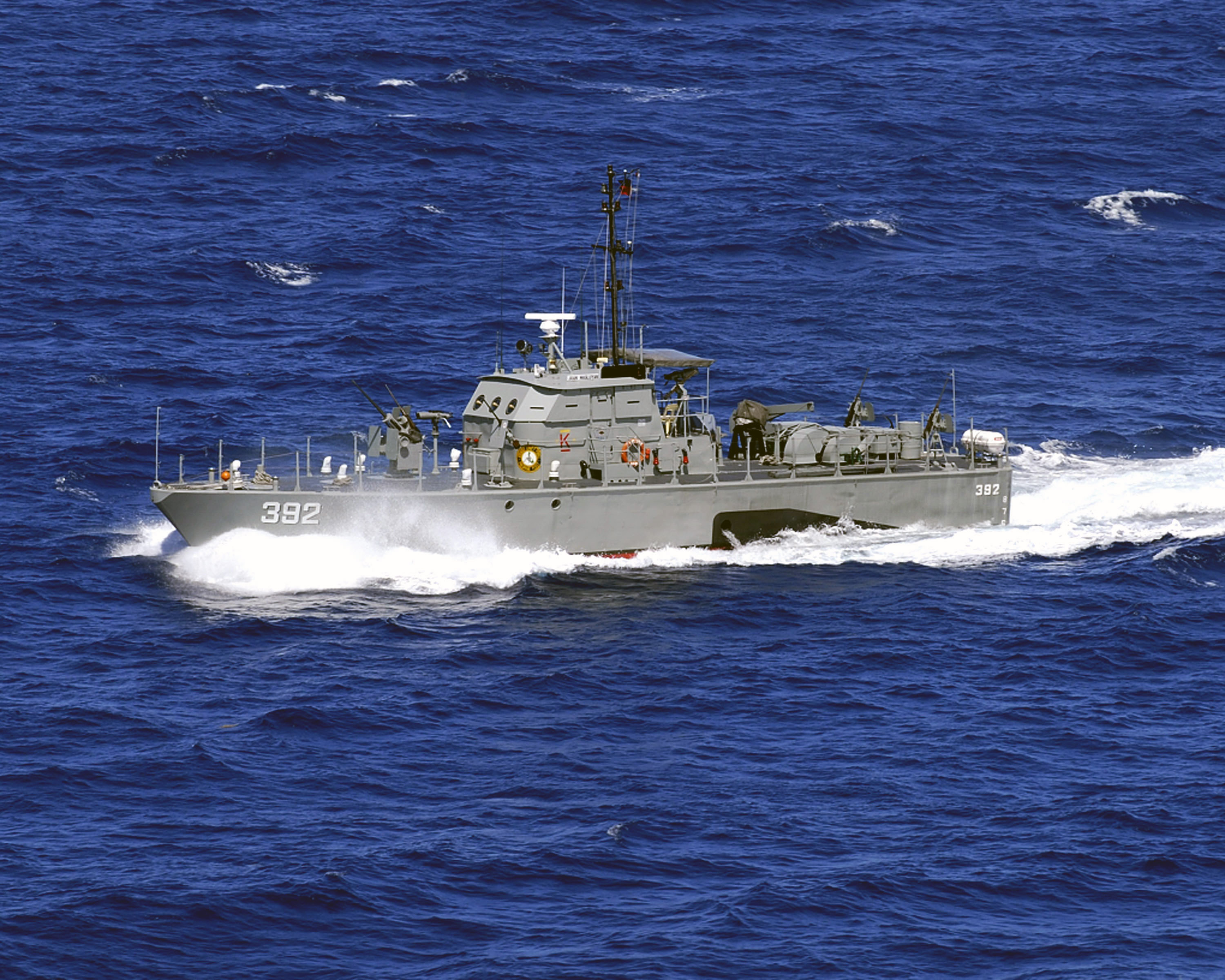
BRP Juan Magluyan (PC 392), a Jose Andrada-class patrol craft.

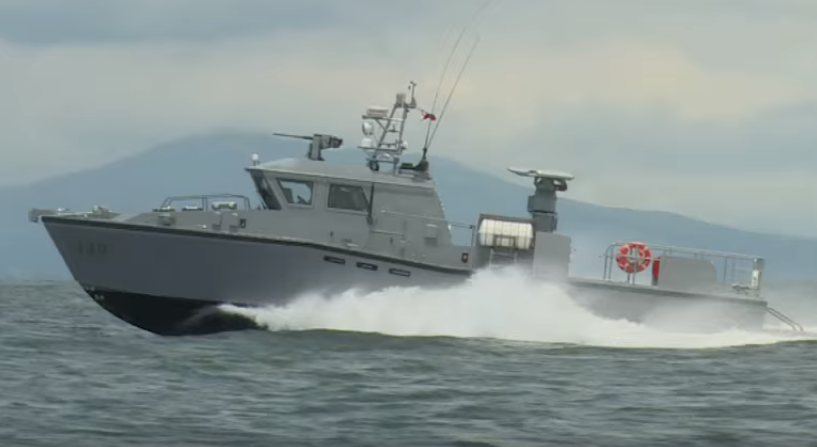
An MPAC Mk. III Missile boat of the Philippine Navy

== See also ==
- Philippine Navy Sea Lions (men's volleyball club)
- Philippine Navy F.C.
