= Vicente Catalan =

Filipino Navy admiral

- Born: Unknown date Cuba, Spanish West Indies
- Died: Unknown date
- Allegiance: Philippine Republic
- Branch: Philippine Republican Navy
- Service years: 1898–1901
- Rank: Admiral
- Commands: Filipinas; Philippine Republican Navy
- Conflicts: Philippine Revolution; Battle of Subic Bay; Philippine-American War

Vicente Catalan was a Cuban-Filipino of Criollo descent known for leading a mutiny against the Spanish naval officers of the 800-ton steamer Compania de Filipinas, which was then a property of the Compañía General de Tabacos de Filipinas, later becoming the first admiral of the Philippine Republican Navy. Catalan was the ship's second officer when he led the mutiny of the Filipino crew members, killing the Spanish officers before taking over as the ship's captain.

== Capture of Filipinas ==
During the second phase of the Philippine Revolution, Catalan joined General Emilio Aguinaldo after the Philippine Revolutionary Navy was established. Initially, the Revolutionary Navy consisted of a small fleet of eight captured Spanish steam launches refitted with 9-centimeter guns. Wealthy Filipino elites later donated five larger vessels to the cause: the Taaleño, the Balayan, the Bulusan, the Taal and the Purísima Concepción. The Compania de Filipinas was later renamed Filipinas and was designated as the navy's flagship with Catalan proclaimed as an admiral.

== International backlash ==
Admiral Catalan with his Filipino sailors helped seize Subic Bay. However, the mutiny and seizure of the Filipinas caused an international incident when the Germans objected to the Filipino flag being hoisted on the ship and the French demanded the ship's return to them, claiming they actually owned it.

Despite the diplomatic backlash from foreign powers, the international incident drew attention to the increasingly aggressive campaign of the Filipinos to oust the Spaniards and establish an independent republic.
