= Balikatan =

Military exercise between the Philippines and the United States

- Part of the Philippines–United States military relations
- Type: Multinational military exercise
- Cause: Philippines–United States Visiting Forces Agreement
- Participants: Armed Forces of the Philippines; United States Armed Forces

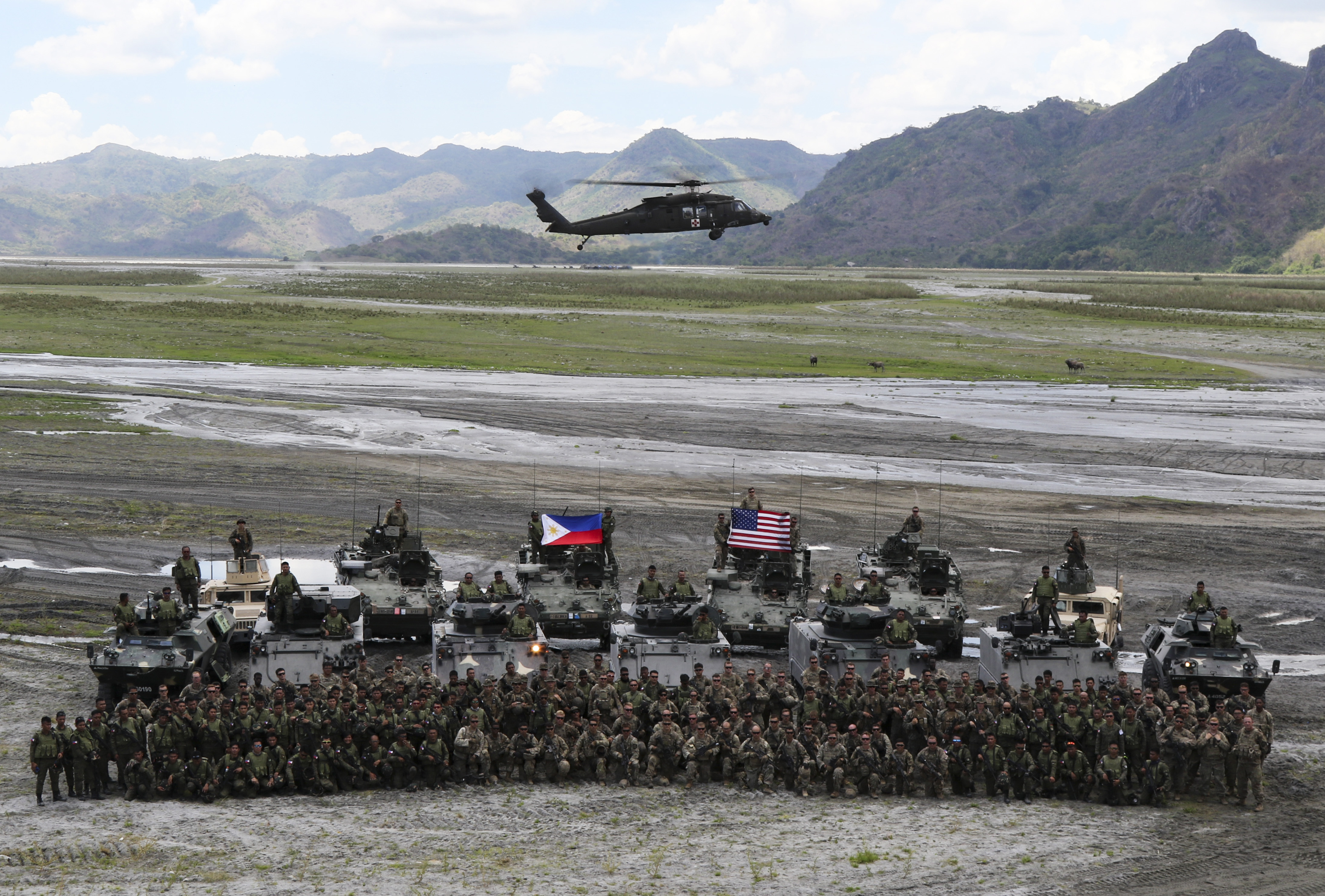
Task Force Regulars, headed by 5th Battalion, 20th Infantry Regiment, 1st Stryker Brigade Combat Team, 2nd Infantry Division and the 1st Brigade Combat Team, Philippine Army, completed a Combined Arms Live-Fire Exercise during Balikatan 2019 at Colonel Ernesto Ravina Air Base, Philippines, April 2019

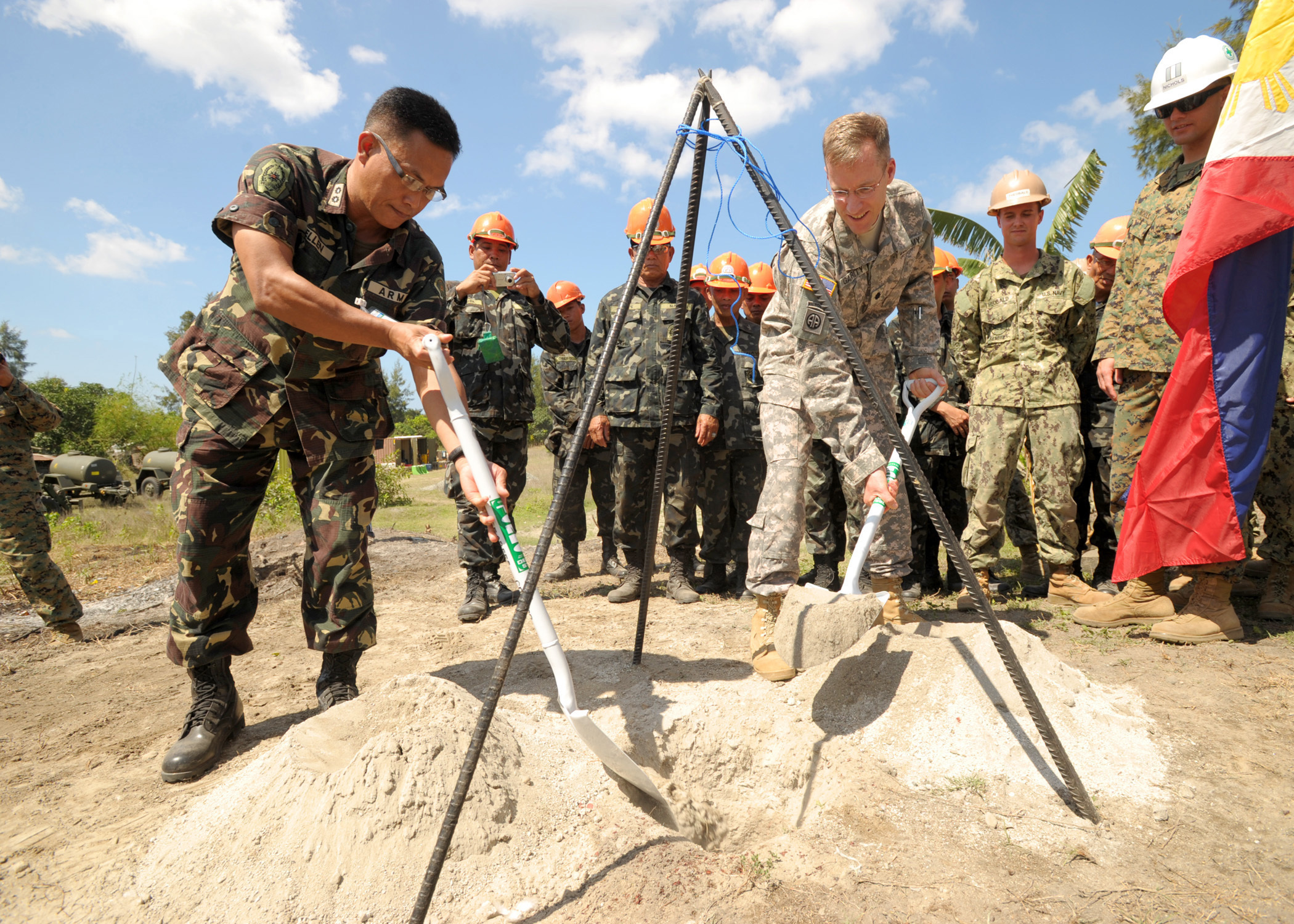
Philippine army Lt. Col. Henry Bellan, left, and U.S. Army Lt. Col. John Garrity bury a time capsule during the construction of a footbridge in San Narciso, Zambales, Balikatan 2013

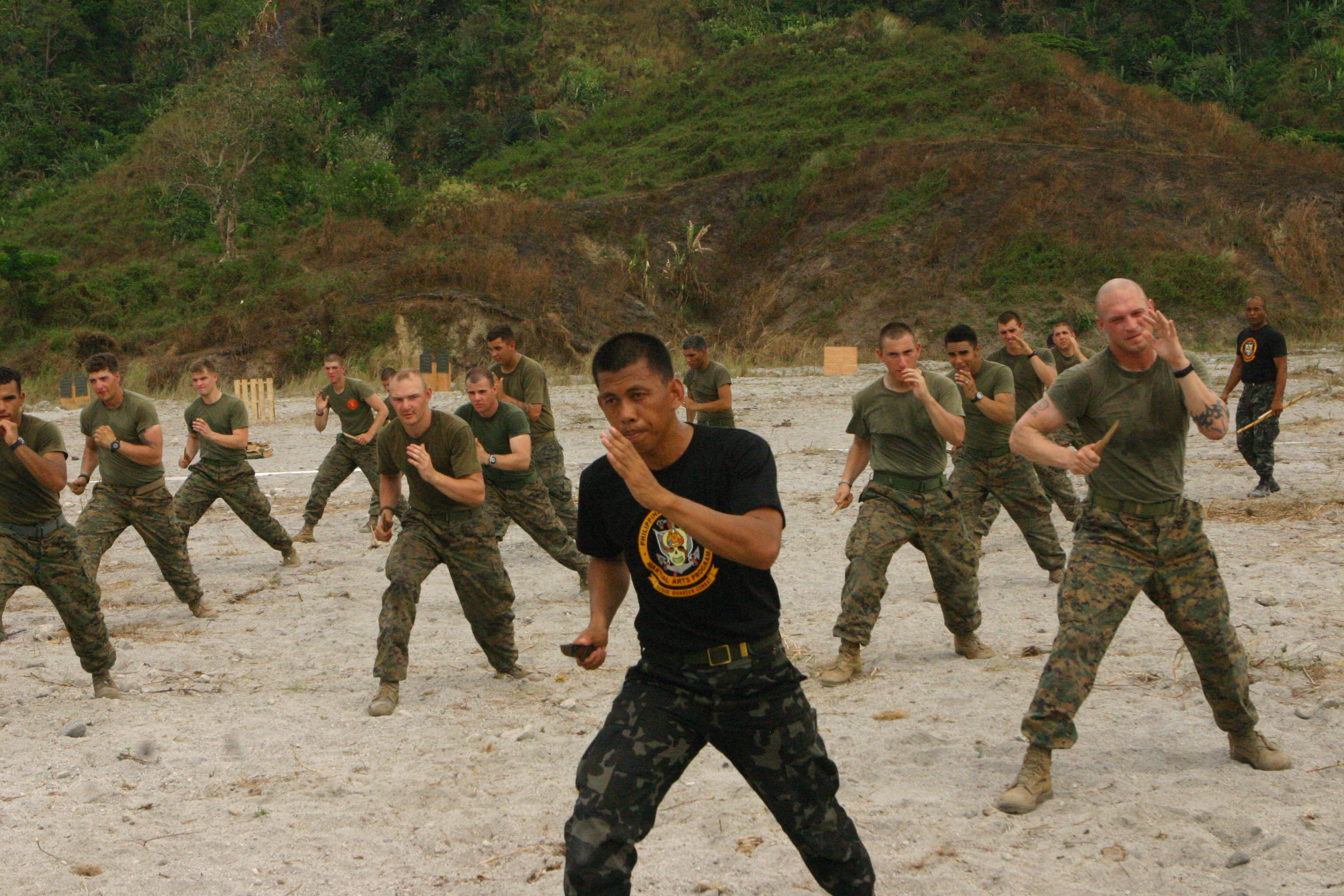
U.S. Marines participated in a martial arts class taught by Philippine Marine Corps instructors, Balikatan 2010 (BK '10)

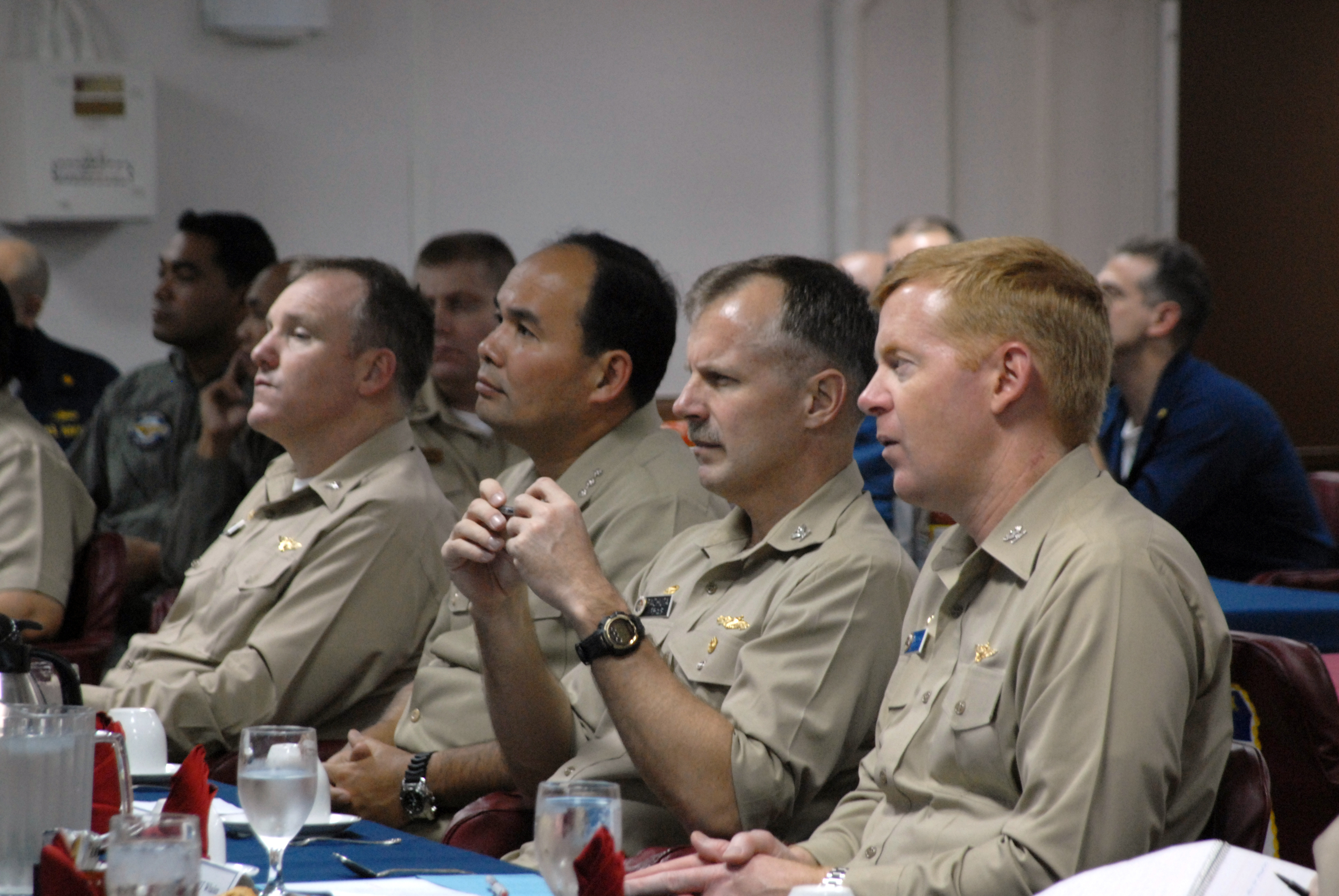
U.S. Navy captains are briefed on Philippine and U.S. Navy events at a pre-sail conference aboard the amphibious assault ship USS Essex, Balikatan 2008

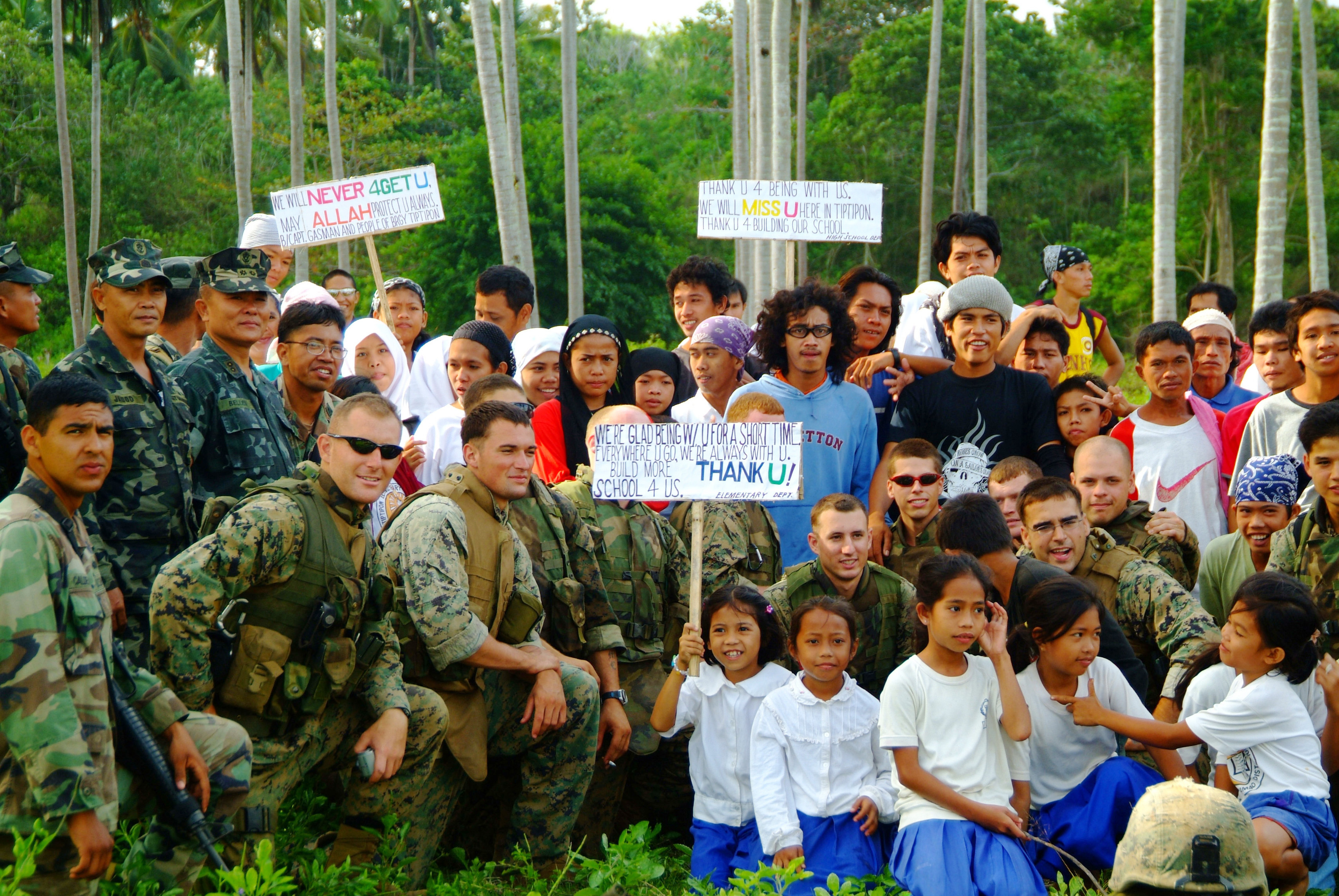
Philippine Marines and villagers from Tiptipon, Jolo pose with U.S. Marines and Sailors assigned to the 31st Marine Service Support Group, Balikatan 2006.

Exercise Balikatan is the most prominent annual military exercise between the Philippines and the United States. The Tagalog word balikatan means "shoulder-to-shoulder". The exercises have been the cornerstone of Philippines–United States military relations since the closure of all 5 U.S. bases in the Philippines, and 13 Philippine military bases being made accessible to U.S. forces as a result of the Enhanced Defense Cooperation Agreement.

Australian armed forces have participated in Balikatan exercises annually since 2014. Australia has a visiting forces agreement, a type of a status of forces agreement, with the Philippines called Philippines–Australia Status of Visiting Forces Agreement. The Philippines is open to other allied countries participating, provided that they too have a similar forces agreement.

== Background ==
The U.S. acquired the Philippines after the Spanish–American War of 1898 and the subsequent Philippine–American War in 1899–1902. The United States granted the Philippines independence in 1946. In 1951, the governments of the United States and the Philippines signed the Mutual Defense Treaty to "strengthen the fabric of peace" in the Pacific by agreeing to defend each other's territory in the case of external attack. In line with this treaty, the United States maintained until 1992 several military bases in the Philippines, including U.S. Naval Base Subic Bay and the Clark Air Base.

In 1998, following the bases' closure, the Visiting Forces Agreement (Philippines – United States) (VFA) was signed which contained guidelines for the conduct and protection of American troops visiting the Philippines, and stipulated the terms and conditions for the American military to enter Philippine territory. The VFA is a reciprocal agreement in that also outlines the requirements for Philippine troops visiting the United States.

The Visiting Forces Agreement led to the establishment of the annual Balikatan exercises, as well as a variety of other cooperative measures.

== Operations ==
The Balikatan exercises are designed to maintain and develop the security relationship between the two countries' armed forces through crisis-action planning, through enhanced training to conduct counterterrorism operations, and through promoting interoperability of the forces.

Over the years the exercises have expanded to include surrounding other countries in Southeast Asia. The training has had a shifting focus. During the U.S.-led "war on terror" the annual Balikatan Exercises focused on training for counterterrorism missions. There were student protests in the early 2010s over the continued presence of U.S. troops in the Philippines.

These military exercises contribute directly to the Philippine armed forces' efforts to root out Abu Sayyaf and Jemaah Islamiyah and bring development to formerly insurgent-held areas, notably Basilan and Jolo. They include combined military training and civil-military operations and humanitarian projects. The International Military Education and Training (IMET) program is the largest in the Pacific and the third-largest in the world. A Mutual Logistics Support Agreement (MLSA) was signed in November 2002.

== Notable exercise years ==
=== Balikatan 2022 ===
The 2022 Balikatan exercise brought together over 5,100 US military personnel and 3,800 Filipino soldiers for training in maritime security, amphibious operations, live-fire training, urban operations, aviation operations, counterterrorism, humanitarian assistance, and disaster relief in various parts of Luzon from March 28 to April 8, 2022. The exercise included a command post exercise that tests the AFP and U.S. forces’ ability to plan, command, and communicate with each other in a simulated environment. This training bolsters the collective security and defensive capabilities of the alliance. Renovation of elementary schools, community health initiatives, and the exchange of advanced emergency rescue and lifesaving techniques were among the collaborative efforts.

The 2022 iteration was considered a return of sorts, since the 2021 iteration was relatively small, and the 2020 iteration had been cancelled altogether after President Rodrigo Duterte temporarily ended the Philippines’ Visiting Forces Agreement (VFA) with the United States in what was seen as an effort to pursue warmer ties with China.

=== Balikatan 2023 ===
Set against the political backdrop of increasing tensions regarding Taiwan and in the South China Sea, as well as the first year of the Presidency of Bongbong Marcos in the Philippines, the 2023 iteration of the Balikatan exercise was marked by further expansion, with more than 17,600 participants making it the largest Balikatan to that date. It involved four major events - the Command Post Exercise, Cyber Defense Exercise, Field Training Exercise, and Humanitarian Civic Assistance (HCA). It also included a Sink Exercise (SINKEX) as part of the littoral live fire exercise held in Zambales, where the former BRP Pangasinan (PS-31), a decommissioned Malvar-class corvette, was used as a target ship. The 2023 exercise also marked the first time the M-142 High Mobility Artillery Rocket System (HIMARS) platform was used in live-fire exercises, which had not been done in the 2016 and 2022 exercises.

=== Balikatan 2024 ===
The 2024 iteration of the 39th edition of Balikatan in Batanes and Palawan on April 22 to May 10, including Integrated Air and Missile Defense exercises in Central Luzon, is marked by further expansions with attendance of military observers from 14 countries. “Cope Thunder,” precedes the exercises from April 8 to April 19 according to the United States Indo-Pacific Command. Barangay San Rafael, Itbayat under Mayor Sabas de Sagon, is the site of the April 14 to June 6 construction of humanitarian, logistics and disaster relief warehouse at Sitio Kagonongan, a supply depot area at the San Rafael National Food Authority warehouse and an American physician’s assistant station and lodging facilities for American soldiers at Itbayat District Hospital. The exercise included war games and drills in international waters (12 nautical miles, or 22.22 kilometers, off the west coast of Palawan), including a “group sail” involving the Philippine Navy, US Navy, Philippine Coast Guard, US Coast Guard, and French Navy and the sinking again of a mock enemy ship—the decommissioned BRP Lake Caliraya (AF-81)—in Laoag City.

=== Balikatan 2025 ===
Japan joined as full-fledged participant. The Netherlands, the Czech Republic, Lithuania and Poland sent military observers to the event for the first time.

=== Balikatan 2026 ===
The Balikatan 2026 exercised commenced on 20 April 2026 with two new full participants, Japan and Canada, which also have visiting forces agreements with the Philippines. Australia, France, and New Zealand were also full participants.

== Foreign participation ==
Country	2012	2013	2014	2015	2016	2017	2018	2019	2021	2022	2023	2024	2025
Australia	Observer	Observer	Yes	—N/a	Observer	Yes	Observer	Yes	—N/a	Observer	Yes	Yes	Yes
Brunei	—N/a	—N/a	—N/a	Observer	Observer	Observer	—N/a	—N/a	—N/a	—N/a	—N/a	Observer	Observer
Cambodia	—N/a	—N/a	—N/a	Observer	Observer	—N/a	—N/a	—N/a	—N/a	—N/a	—N/a	—N/a	—N/a
Canada	—N/a	—N/a	—N/a	—N/a	—N/a	—N/a	—N/a	Observer	—N/a	—N/a	—N/a	Observer	Observer
China	—N/a	—N/a	—N/a	—N/a	—N/a	—N/a	—N/a	—N/a	—N/a	—N/a	—N/a	Uninvited observer	Uninvited observer
Colombia	—N/a	—N/a	—N/a	—N/a	—N/a	—N/a	—N/a	—N/a	—N/a	—N/a	—N/a	—N/a	Observer
Czech Republic	—N/a	—N/a	—N/a	—N/a	—N/a	—N/a	—N/a	—N/a	—N/a	—N/a	—N/a	—N/a	Observer
France	—N/a	—N/a	—N/a	—N/a	—N/a	—N/a	—N/a	—N/a	—N/a	—N/a	Observer	Yes	Observer
Germany	—N/a	—N/a	—N/a	—N/a	—N/a	—N/a	—N/a	—N/a	—N/a	—N/a	—N/a	Observer	Observer
India	—N/a	—N/a	—N/a	Observer	Observer	—N/a	—N/a	—N/a	—N/a	—N/a	Observer	Observer	Observer
Indonesia	Observer	—N/a	—N/a	Observer	Observer	—N/a	—N/a	—N/a	—N/a	—N/a	—N/a	Observer	Observer
Japan	Observer	Observer	—N/a	Observer	Observer	Yes	Observer	Observer	—N/a	Observer	Observer	Observer	Yes
Laos	—N/a	—N/a	—N/a	Observer	Observer	—N/a	—N/a	—N/a	—N/a	—N/a	—N/a	—N/a	—N/a
Malaysia	Observer	—N/a	—N/a	Observer	Observer	—N/a	—N/a	—N/a	—N/a	—N/a	—N/a	Observer	Observer
New Zealand	—N/a	—N/a	—N/a	—N/a	—N/a	—N/a	—N/a	Observer	—N/a	—N/a	—N/a	Observer	Observer
Poland	—N/a	—N/a	—N/a	—N/a	—N/a	—N/a	—N/a	—N/a	—N/a	—N/a	—N/a	—N/a	Observer
Singapore	Observer	—N/a	—N/a	Observer	Observer	Observer	—N/a	—N/a	—N/a	—N/a	—N/a	Observer	Observer
South Korea	Observer	—N/a	—N/a	Observer	Observer	Observer	—N/a	Observer	—N/a	—N/a	Observer	Observer	Observer
Thailand	—N/a	—N/a	—N/a	Observer	Observer	Observer	—N/a	Observer	—N/a	—N/a	—N/a	Observer	Observer
Timor-Leste	—N/a	—N/a	—N/a	Observer	Observer	Observer	—N/a	—N/a	—N/a	—N/a	—N/a	—N/a	—N/a
United Kingdom	—N/a	—N/a	—N/a	—N/a	—N/a	—N/a	—N/a	Observer	—N/a	Observer	Observer	Observer	Observer
United States	Yes	Yes	Yes	Yes	Yes	Yes	Yes	Yes	Yes	Yes	Yes	Yes	Yes
Vietnam	Observer	—N/a	—N/a	Observer	—N/a	—N/a	—N/a	Observer	—N/a	—N/a	—N/a	Observer	Observer

== See also ==
Philippines geostrategy

- Operation Enduring Freedom – Philippines
- Enhanced Defense Cooperation Agreement
- Operation Balikatan (2003)

Regional geostrategy

- Belt and Road Initiative
- China containment policy
- China-United States relations
- Quadrilateral Security Dialogue
- Malabar (naval exercise)
- List of disputed territories of China
- String of Pearls (Indian Ocean)
- Territorial disputes in the South China Sea
