= Philippines–United States Visiting Forces Agreement =

Bilateral agreement between the Philippines and the United States

- Type: Visiting forces agreement
- Effective: May 27, 1999
- Parties: Philippines; United States

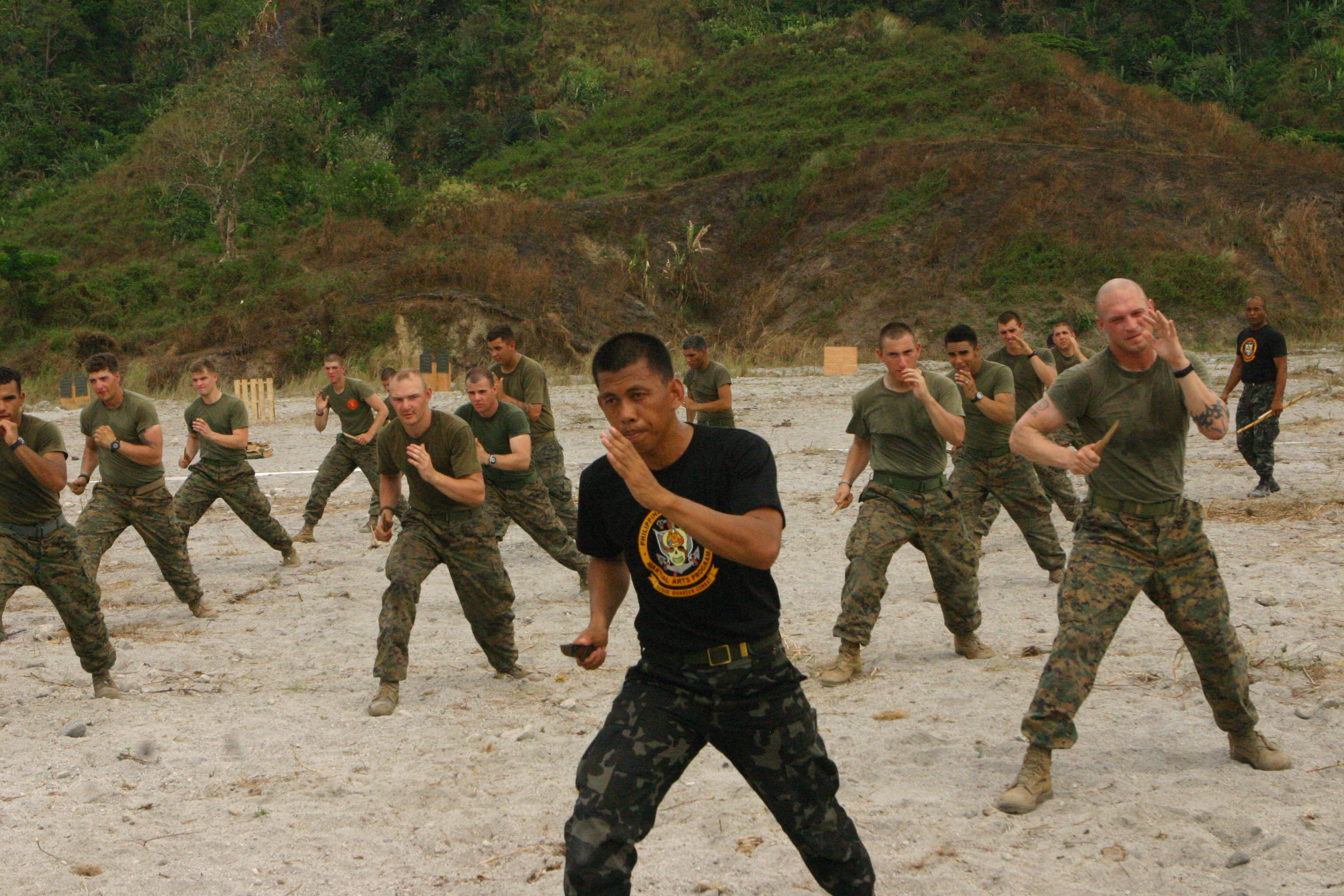
US Marines participate in a martial arts class taught by Philippine Marine Corps instructors, Balikatan 2010 (BK '10)

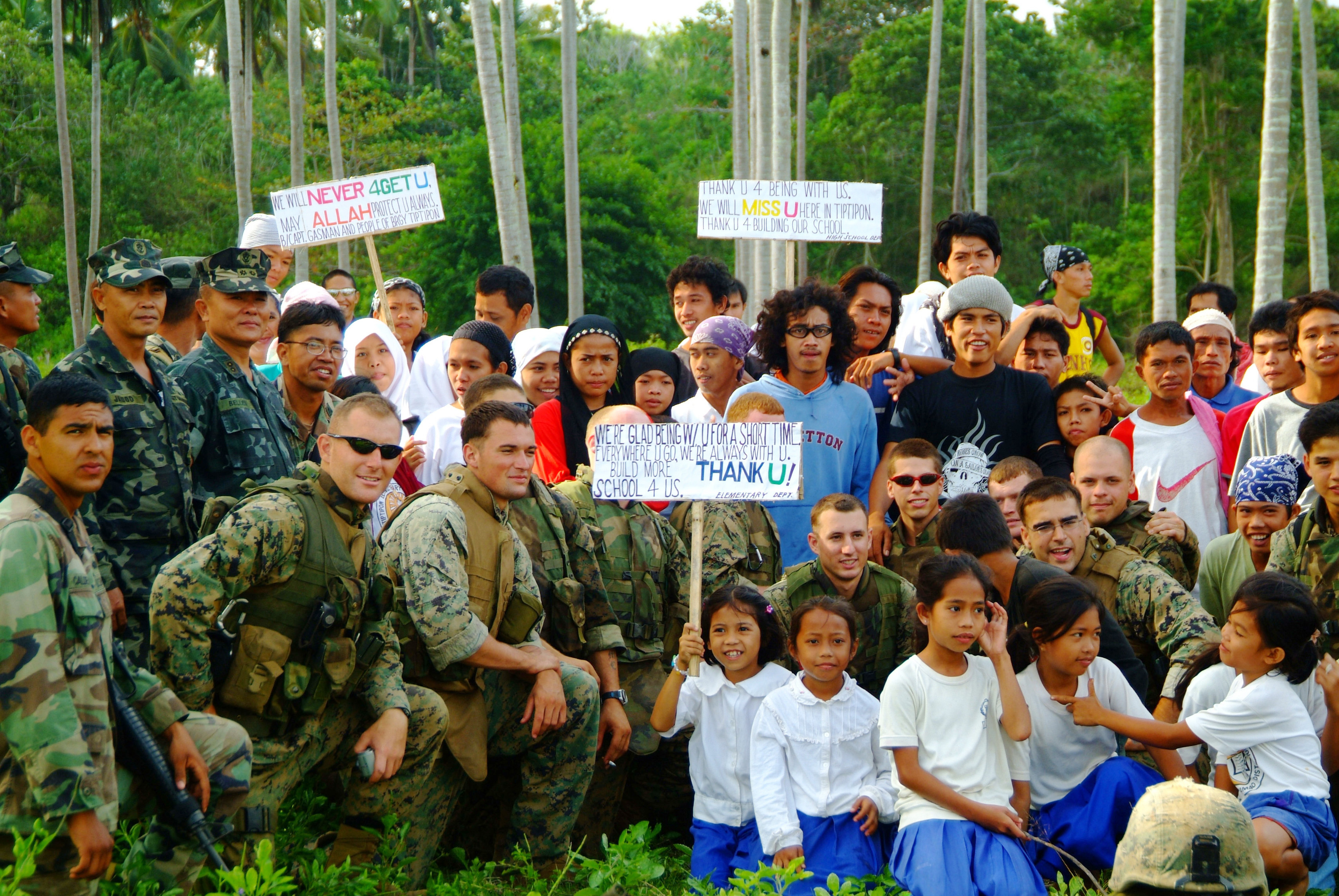
Philippine Marines and villagers from Tiptipon, Jolo pose with US Marines and sailors assigned to the 31st Marine Service Support Group, Balikatan 2006.

The Philippines–United States Visiting Forces Agreement, sometimes the PH–US Visiting Forces Agreement, is a bilateral visiting forces agreement between the Philippines and the United States consisting of two separate documents. The first of these documents is commonly referred to as "the VFA" or "VFA-1", and the second as "VFA-2" or "the Counterpart Agreement". A visiting forces agreement is a version of a status of forces agreement that only applies to troops temporarily in a country. The agreements came into force on May 27, 1999, upon ratification by the Senate of the Philippines. The United States government regards these documents to be executive agreements not requiring approval by the United States Senate.

== VFA-1 ==
The primary effect of the agreement is that it allows the US government to retain jurisdiction over US military personnel accused of committing crimes in the Philippines, unless the crimes are "of particular importance to the Philippines". This means that for crimes without this significance, the US can refuse to detain or arrest accused personnel, or may instead prosecute them under US jurisdiction. Under the Visiting Forces Agreement, the local courts have one year to complete any legal proceedings. The agreement also exempts US military personnel from visa and passport regulations in the Philippines.

The agreement contains various procedural safeguards which amongst other things establish the right to due process and proscribe double jeopardy. The Agreement also prevents US military personnel from being tried in Filipino religious or military courts^{[V 11]}; requires both governments to waive any claims concerning loss of materials (though it does require that the US honor contractual arrangements and comply with US law regarding payment of just and reasonable compensation in settlement of meritorious claims for damage, loss, personal injury or death, caused by acts or omissions of United States personnel)^{[VI]}; exempts material exported and imported by the military from duties or taxes^{[VII]}; and allows unrestricted movement of U.S. vessels and aircraft in the Philippines.^{[VIII]}

== VFA-2 ==
The primary effect of the agreement is to require the US government to notify Philippine authorities when it becomes aware of the apprehension, arrest or detention of any Philippine personnel visiting the US and, when so requested by the Philippine government, to ask the appropriate authorities to waive jurisdiction in favor of the Philippines, except in cases of special interest to the US Departments of State or Defense.^{[VIII 1]} Waiving of jurisdiction in the US is complicated because the United States is a federation of US states and therefore a federation of jurisdictions.

The agreement contains various procedural safeguards to protect rights to due process and proscribe double jeopardy.^{[VIII 2–6]} The agreement also exempts Philippine personnel from visa formalities and guarantees expedited entry and exit processing;^{[IV]} requires the US to accept Philippine drivers licenses;^{[V]} allows Philippine personnel to carry arms at US military installations while on duty;^{[VI]} provides personal tax exemptions and import/export duty exclusions for Philippine personnel;^{[X, XI]} requires the US to provide health care to Philippine personnel;^{[XIV]} and exempts Philippine vehicles, vessels, and aircraft from landing or ports fees, navigation or overflight charges, road tolls or any other charges for the use of US military installations.^{[XV]}

== Incidents ==
=== Subic rape accusation ===
The US has at least twice used the agreement to keep accused military personnel under US jurisdiction. On January 18, 2006, the US military maintained custody of four troops accused of rape while visiting Subic Bay during their trial by a Philippine court. They were held by American officials at the United States Embassy in Manila. This led to protests by those who believe that the agreement is one-sided, prejudicial, and contrary to the sovereignty of the Philippines. The agreement has been characterized as granting immunity from prosecution to US military personnel who commit crimes against Filipinos, and as treating Filipinos as second class citizens in their own country. As a result of these issues, in 2006, some members of the Philippine Congress considered terminating the VFA. However, the agreement was not changed.

=== Death of Jennifer Laude ===
A second Philippine court case under the VFA is the one following the death of Jennifer Laude, also involving a US Navy ship docked at Subic Bay. This case happened after the Enhanced Defense Cooperation Agreement was signed.

== Supreme Court cases ==
The constitutionality of the VFA was challenged twice. The case Bayan v. Zamora was dismissed on October 10, 2000, by the Supreme Court of the Philippines, sitting en banc.

The second challenge, Suzette Nicolas y Sombilon Vs. Alberto Romulo, et al. / Jovito R. Salonga, et al. Vs. Daniel Smith, et al. / Bagong Alyansang Makabayan, et al. Vs. President Gloria Macapagal-Arroyo, et al. submitted on January 2, 2007, was decided on February 11, 2009, again by the Supreme Court sitting en banc. In deciding this second challenge, the court ruled 9–4 (with two justices inhibiting) that, "The Visiting Forces Agreement (VFA) between the Republic of the Philippines and the United States, entered into on February 10, 1998, is UPHELD as constitutional, ...". The decision continued, specifically relating to matters relevant to the Subic Rape Case, "... the Romulo-Kenney Agreements of December 19 and 22, 2006 are DECLARED not in accordance with the VFA, and respondent Secretary of Foreign Affairs is hereby ordered to forthwith negotiate with the United States representatives for the appropriate agreement on detention facilities under Philippine authorities as provided in Art. V, Sec. 10 of the VFA, pending which the status quo shall be maintained until further orders by this Court." UP professor Harry Roque, counsel for former senator Jovito Salonga, one of the petitioners in the case, said in a phone interview regarding the decision on the constitutionality of the VFA. "We will appeal, ... We are hoping we could convince the other justices to join the four dissenters."

== Status of the agreement ==
On February 11, 2020, Philippine President Rodrigo Duterte formally announced to the United States embassy in Manila that he was ending the pact, with termination to take effect in 180 days unless agreed otherwise during that time. Duterte has in the past shown admiration for both the Russian Armed Forces, as well as the Chinese People's Liberation Army, despite the fact that the Philippines and China are embroiled in a dispute in the South China Sea regarding sovereignty over the Spratly Islands. In June 2020, the Philippine government reversed this decision and announced that it would maintain the agreement. In November, 2020, Philippine President Rodrigo Duterte ordered an extra six months "To enable us to find a more enhanced, mutually beneficial, mutually agreeable, and more effective and lasting arrangement on how to move forward in our mutual defense".

In a speech on February 12, 2021, President Duterte addressed himself to the US on this saying, "I would like to put on notice if there's an American agent here that from now on, you want the Visiting Forces Agreement done? Well, you have to pay". He went on to say, "It's a shared responsibility but your share of responsibility does not come free because after all when the war breaks out, we all pay," Foreign Affairs Secretary Teodoro Locsin had said a few days earlier that the Philippines and the US would soon meet to "iron out whatever differences we have", declining to elaborate further. Duterte's statement was criticized by Senator Panfilo Lacson and Vice President Leni Robredo over "extortion" remark. On February 13, the international news magazine The Diplomat published a podcast episode discussing the matter.

On July 30, 2021, President Duterte ordered the reinstatement of the agreement.

== See also ==
- Balikatan, annual military exercises under the VFA
- Mutual Defense Treaty (United States–Philippines)
- Enhanced Defense Cooperation Agreement
- Philippines–Australia Status of Visiting Forces Agreement
- Visiting Forces Act
- Visiting forces agreement
- Status of forces agreement
