= BRP Jose Rizal =

Flagship of the Philippine Navy

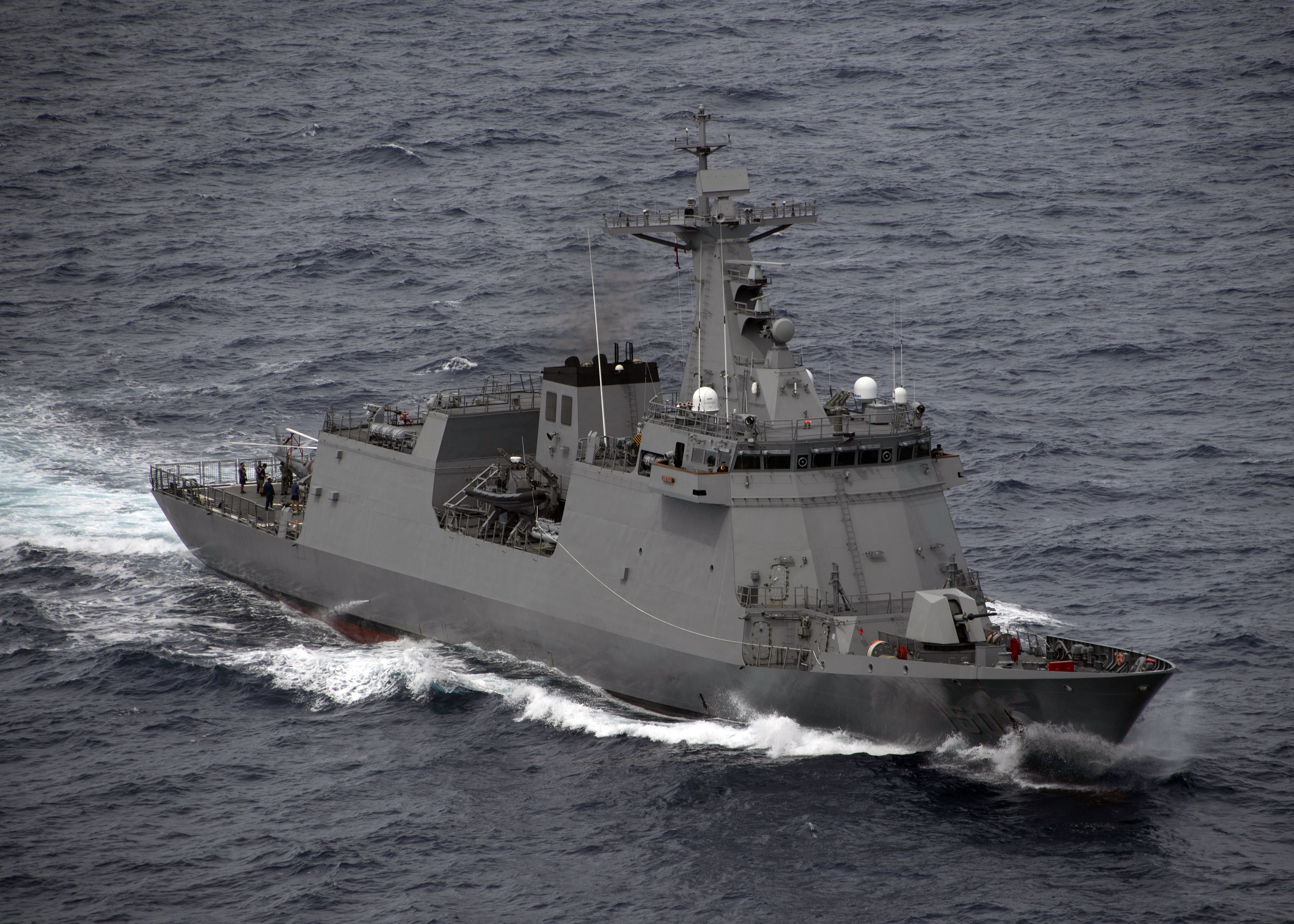
- BRP Jose Rizal at RIMPAC 2020

Philippines
- Name: BRP Jose Rizal
- Namesake: José Protasio Rizal Mercado y Alonso Realonda
- Ordered: 24 October 2016
- Builder: Hyundai Heavy Industries
- Laid down: 16 October 2018
- Launched: 23 May 2019
- Commissioned: 10 July 2020
- Home port: Naval Base Subic
- Identification: FFG14
- Status: Active
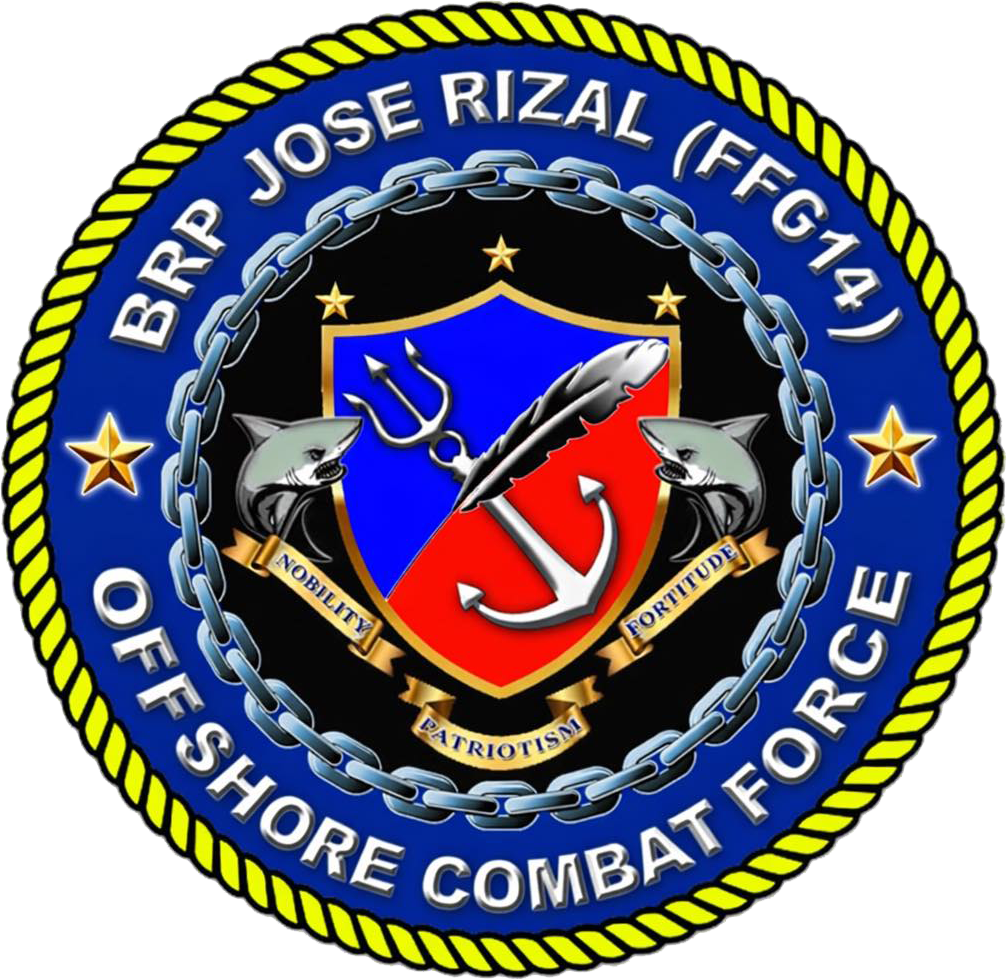
- Badge

General characteristics
- Class & type: Jose Rizal-class frigate
- Displacement: 2,600 tonnes
- Length: 107 m (351 ft 1 in)
- Beam: 13.8 m (45 ft 3 in)
- Draft: 3.65 m (12 ft 0 in)
- Depth: 6.9 m (22 ft 8 in)
- Installed power: 4 × MTU-STX 12V2000-M41B diesel generators, each producing around 650 kW (872 shp)
- Propulsion: Combined diesel and diesel (CODAD) arrangement: 4 × MTU-STX 12V1163-TB93 12-cylinder diesel engines
- Speed: 25 knots (46 km/h; 29 mph)
- Range: 4,500 nmi (8,300 km; 5,200 mi)
- Endurance: 30 days
- Boats & landing craft carried: 2 × RHIB
- Complement: Accommodation for 110 persons: Crew: 65; Non-organic: 25; Additional personnel: 20
- Sensors & processing systems: Combat system: Hanwha Systems Naval Shield Baseline 2 Integrated CMS; Search radar: Hensoldt TRS-3D Baseline D multi-mode phased array C-band radar; Navigation radar: Kelvin Hughes SharpEye I-band & E/F-band radars; Fire control radar: Selex ES NA-25X fire control radar; Electro-Optical Tracking System: Safran PASEO NS electro-optical; Tactical Data Link: Hanwha Systems Link P (Link K Derivative); Link 16 LOS datalink (planned); Link 22 BLOS datalink (planned); Sonar: Harris Model 997 medium frequency active/passive hull mounted sonar; Thales CAPTAS-2 Towed Array Sonar (planned)
- Electronic warfare & decoys: RESM: Elbit Systems Elisra NS9003A; Countermeasures: 2 × Terma C-Guard DL-6T decoy launchers
- Armament: Missiles; 4 × C-Star SSM-710K antiship cruise missiles in two twin-round inclined canisters; 2 × Simbad-RC twin-Mistral missile launchers; 8-cell Vertical Launching System with a height of 5.2 meters (FFBNW); Torpedoes; 2 × SEA triple-tube 324mm torpedo launching systems; K745 Blue Shark torpedoes; Guns; 1 × OTO-Melara 76/62SR dual-purpose rapid-fire autocannon; 1 × Aselsan SMASH 30mm remote weapon station autocannon; 4 × K6 (12.7mm) 50cal heavy machine guns; 1 × Close-in weapon system (FFBNW)
- Aircraft carried: 1 × AW159 Wildcat naval helicopter
- Aviation facilities: flight deck for a 12t helicopter; enclosed hangar (starboard side) for 10t helicopter

BRP Jose Rizal (FFG-14) is the lead ship of her class of guided missile frigates of the Philippine Navy. She is the first purpose-built frigate of the service, as its previous major warships were mostly obtained from retired patrol ships of other countries. She is also one of the navy's primary warships able to conduct multi-role operations, such as coastal patrol, anti-air and anti-submarine warfare.

== Construction and design ==
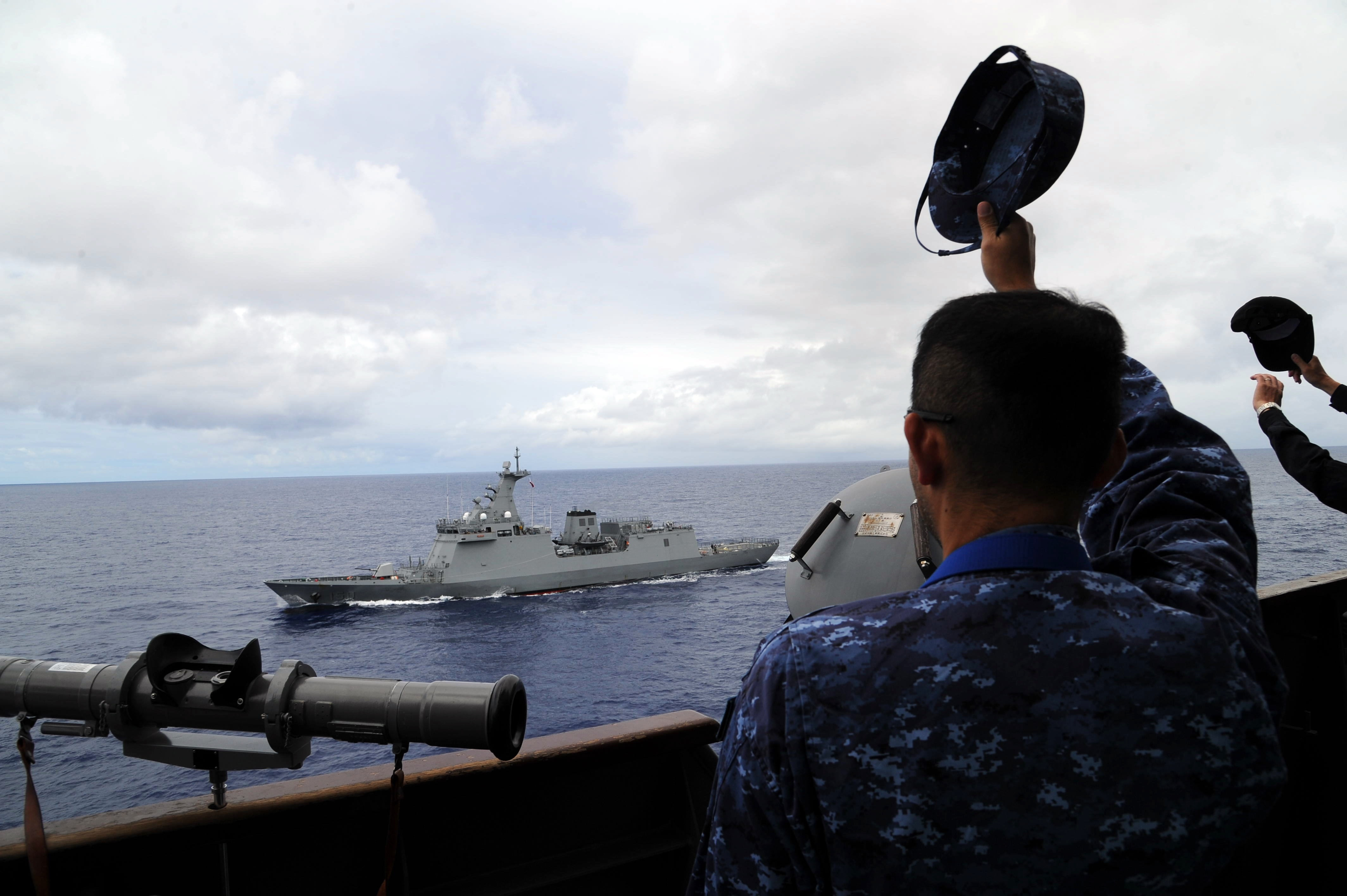
BRP Jose Rizal from JMSDF Ship at RIMPAC 2020

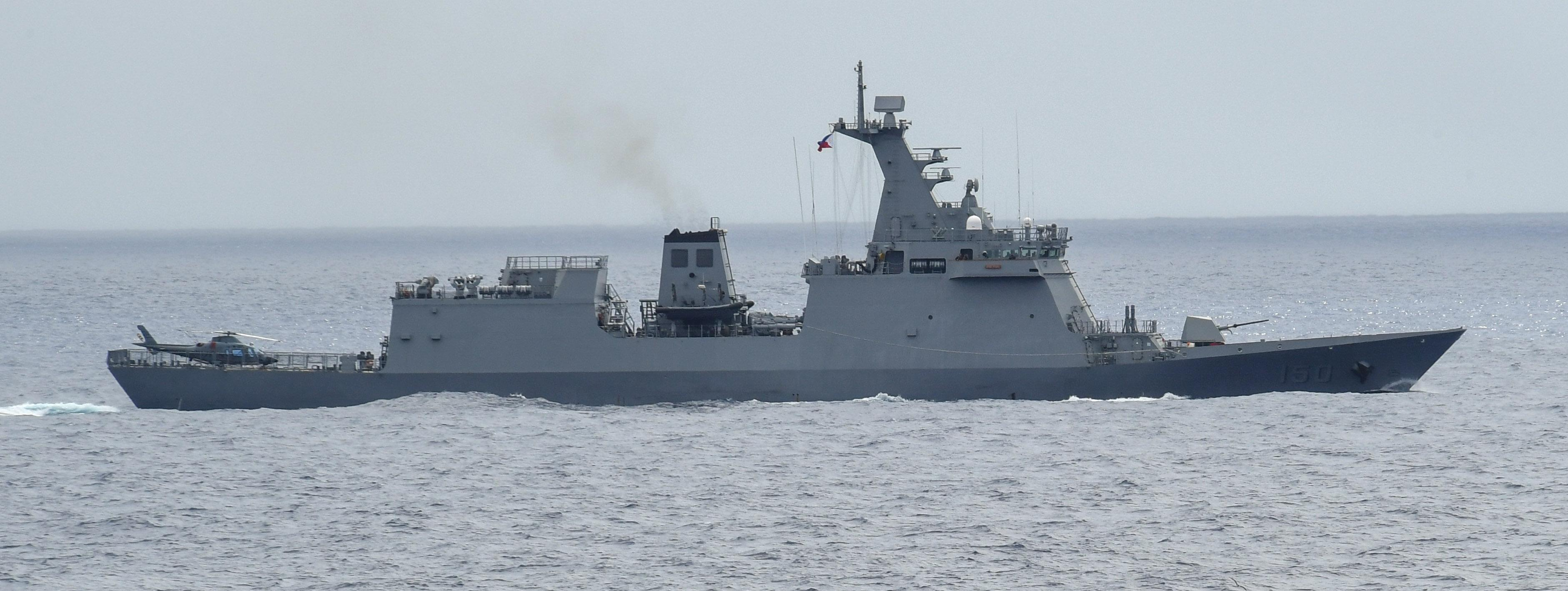
BRP Jose Rizal (FF-150) participates in a tactical maneuvering drill with U.S. Coast Guard and U.S. Navy ships during exercise RIMPAC 2020

The BRP Jose Rizal was designed and built by Hyundai Heavy Industries (HHI) of South Korea, and is based on the shipbuilder's HDF-2600 design, which in turn was derived from the Incheon-class frigate of the Republic of Korea Navy. Changes were made on the base design by making use of design developments and features found on newer frigates of the R.O.K. Navy, considering reduced radar cross-section by having cleaner lines, smooth surface design, reduced overhangs and a low freeboard.

On 1 May 2018, the steel cutting ceremony was held for P159 (project number of first of two frigates) at HHI's shipyard in Ulsan, South Korea, marking the first step of the vessel's construction journey.

On 16 October 2018, HHI held the keel laying ceremony for P159, marking the formal start of the construction of the ship.

On 20 December 2018, Secretary of National Defense Delfin Lorenzana announced the names of the two future frigates being built by HHI: BRP Jose Rizal and BRP Antonio Luna.

On 23 May 2019, HHI launched the first vessel, the prospective BRP Jose Rizal. In a press briefing the same day, a Hanwha official said that Link 16 would likely not be compatible for the frigates until 2020 because of issues between US and South Korea.

From November 2019 to February 2020, HHI held six sea trials that tested:

- the vessel's general seaworthiness and propulsion and associated systems, including its radars,
- the communications and navigational equipment,
- firing of its Super Rapid 76mm main gun,
- weapons and sensors, vessel performance, and integrated platform management system.

The entire team of the Technical Inspection and Acceptance Committee witnessed the sea acceptance tests for the ship in South Korea, and reported that it had "generally satisfactory" results.

On 23 May 2020, the ship arrived in Subic Bay, Zambales after a five-day journey from Ulsan, South Korea. The commissioning was delayed after one of the ship's 65-crew tested positive for COVID-19 amidst the pandemic. On 10 July 2020, the ship was eventually commissioned into service, making the name BRP Jose Rizal (FF-150) official.

== Service history ==
The BRP Jose Rizal participated in RIMPAC 2020.

In December 2021, she was dispatched to Palawan to provide humanitarian assistance to communities affected by Typhoon Odette.

On 16 October 2022, Jose Rizal became the first Philippine Navy ship to conduct a Replenishment at Sea when she received 30,000 liters of fuel from HMAS Stalwart of the Royal Australian Navy.

On 27 April 2023, Jose Rizal participated in the sinking of BRP Pangasinan as part of the Balikatan 2023 exercise. The ship fired its naval guns at BRP Pangasinan.

On 15 June 2023, Jose Rizal arrived in Ulsan, South Korea for her first dry docking and refit period. The refit of both ships of the class was completed as of September 2023.

On 4 September 2023, Jose Rizal conducted a bilateral sail with the USS Ralph Johnson in the South China Sea.

On 8 May 2024, Jose Rizal fired an SSM-700K C-Star anti-ship missile at the decommissioned BRP Lake Caliraya as part of the Balikatan 2024 exercise. Also participating in the exercise was the BRP Lawrence Narag firing a Spike NLOS missile, aircraft from the Philippine Air Force and United States Air Force, and ATMOS 2000 artillery from the Philippine Army. The Lake Caliraya sunk at 10:49AM, over two hours after the exercise began.

Between 28 November to 29 November 2024, Jose Rizal tracked the Russian Navy submarine Ufa as the former conducted a surfaced transit of the West Philippine Sea within the Philippine Exclusive Economic Zone, enroute to the Kamchatka Naval Base.

In February 2025, Jose Rizal was conducting a "regular maritime and sovereignty patrol" when she monitored three People's Liberation Army Navy vessels off. She warned off and issued radio challenges to the Chinese vessels. She conducted a joint patrol with BRP Gregorio del Pilar, French aircraft carrier Charles de Gaulle, French frigate Forbin, French frigate Alsace, French frigate Provence, and Replenishment Ship Jacques Chevallier in the West Philippine Sea.

On 28 April 2025, BRP Jose Rizal fired two Mistral 3 Surface-to-Air Missiles (SAM) from both of its SIMBAD-RC Launchers on two aerial target drones marking a historic first in the Philippine Navy and the AFP.

On 14 March 2026, its pennant number designation changed from FF-150 to FFG-14.

== See also ==
- BRP Antonio Luna (FF-151)
