= Russian submarine Ufa =

Kilo-class Russian Navy submarine

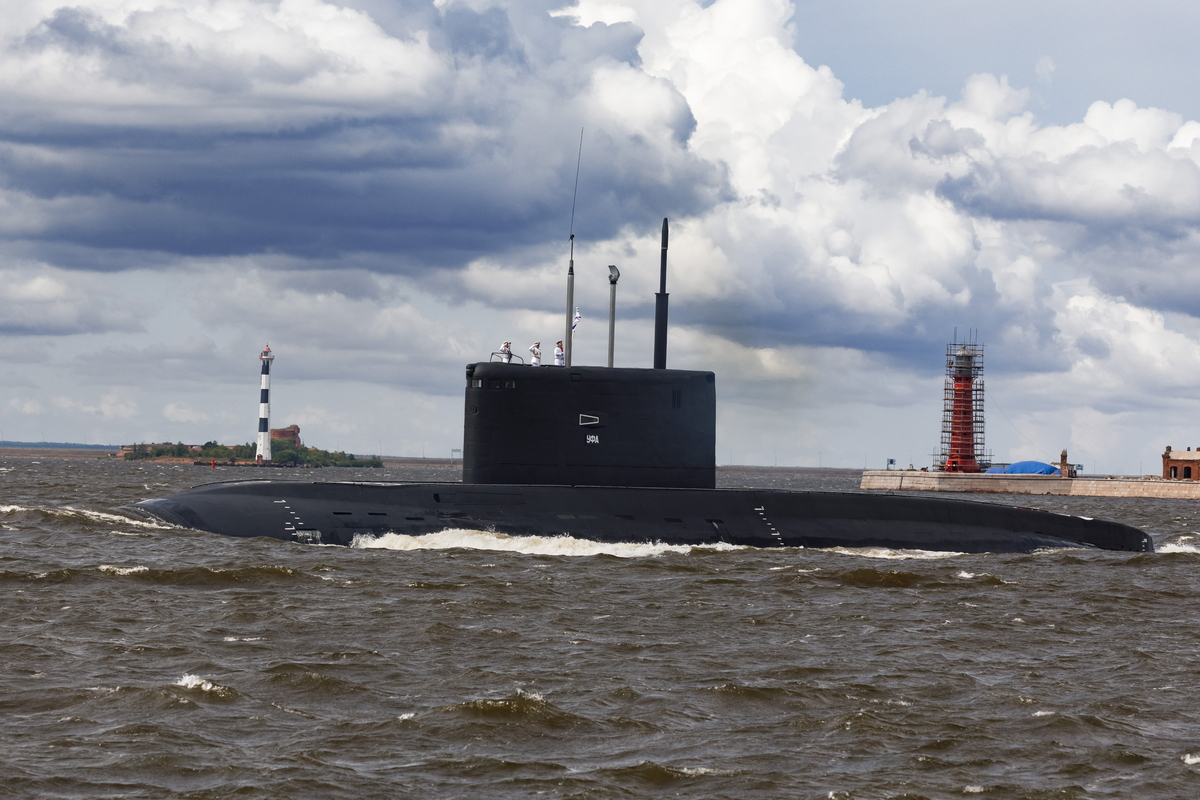
- Ufa on Navy Day in 2023

History

Russia
- Name: Ufa (B-588)
- Namesake: Ufa
- Builder: Admiralty Shipyards, Saint Petersburg
- Laid down: 1 November 2019
- Launched: 31 March 2022
- Commissioned: 16 November 2022
- Status: in active service

General characteristics
- Class & type: Kilo-class submarine
- Displacement: 2,350 t (2,310 long tons) surfaced; 3,100 t (3,100 long tons)
- Length: 74 m (242 ft 9 in)
- Beam: 9.9 m (32 ft 6 in)
- Draft: 6.1 m (20 ft 0 in)
- Propulsion: Diesel-electric propulsion; 2 × diesel generators; 1 × electric motor; 1 × shaft
- Endurance: 45 days
- Test depth: 300 m (980 ft)
- Complement: 52 officers and sailors
- Armament: 6 × 553 mm (21.8 in) torpedo tubes

Ufa (B-588; Russian: Б-588 «Уфа») is a Project 636.3 (NATO reporting name Improved Kilo II-class) diesel-electric attack submarine of the Russian Navy. It was laid down on 1 November 2019, launched on 31 March 2022, and commissioned on 16 November 2022. Ufa is assigned to the Pacific Fleet in Vladivostok.

== Design ==
It was developed starting in 1974 by the Rubin Design Bureau as the Project 877 (NATO reporting name Kilo-class) diesel-electric attack submarine for the Soviet Navy. In the 1990s the original design received upgrades to its stealth, propulsion, and automation, becoming the Project 636 (Improved Kilo class). Beginning from 2010, further improvements led to the Project 636.3 (Improved Kilo II class). The Improved Kilo II has a displacement of 2,350 tonnes (2,310 long tons) while surfaced and 3,100 tonnes (3,100 long tons) while under water. It has a length of 74 metres (242 ft 9 in), a beam of 9.9 metres (32 ft 6 in), and a draft of 6.1 metres (20 ft 0 in).

With diesel-electric propulsion, its single propeller shaft is driven by an electric motor, powered by two diesel generators, which give it a speed of 17 kn (31 km/h; 20 mph) on the surface or 20 kn (37 km/h; 23 mph) submerged. The submarine has a crew of 52 officers and sailors and can stay at sea for 45 days. Its maximum diving depth is reported as 300 metres (984 ft 3 in). The armament consists of six 553 mm (21.8 in) torpedo tubes, which can launch torpedoes, naval mines, or missiles. Some Improved Kilo II submarines are armed with variants of the Kalibr cruise missile, being able to hold up to four of them. Alternatively, they can hold up to 18 torpedoes or 24 naval mines.

== History ==
Ufa was laid down at the Admiralty Shipyards in Saint Petersburg on 1 November 2019, along with its sister ship, Magadan. They were the third and fourth boats, respectively, of the six Improved Kilo II submarines ordered for the Pacific Fleet. Ufa was launched on 31 March 2022 and was commissioned into the Russian Navy on 16 November 2022. After commissioning, it underwent a shakedown period and crew training in the Baltic Sea until December 2023, when it was deployed to the Tartus naval base in Syria, in support of the Russian intervention in the Syrian civil war. Ufa departed on 1 December, arriving in the Mediterranean on 16 December 2023. The submarine stayed with the Mediterranean Sea Task Force until 29 September 2024, when it departed to join the Pacific Fleet.

On its way, Ufa stopped at Kochi, India, in October 2024, and at Surabaya, Indonesia, on 7 November. From 20 to 23 November, Ufa visited the Kota Kinabalu naval base of the Royal Malaysian Navy, the headquarters of its submarine command. The Russian crew was given a tour of the facilities and had a discussion with their Malaysian counterparts on future joint submarine activities. On 24 November Ufa took part in a passing exercise with a Scorpène-class submarine and a surface ship of the Royal Malaysian Navy in the South China Sea.

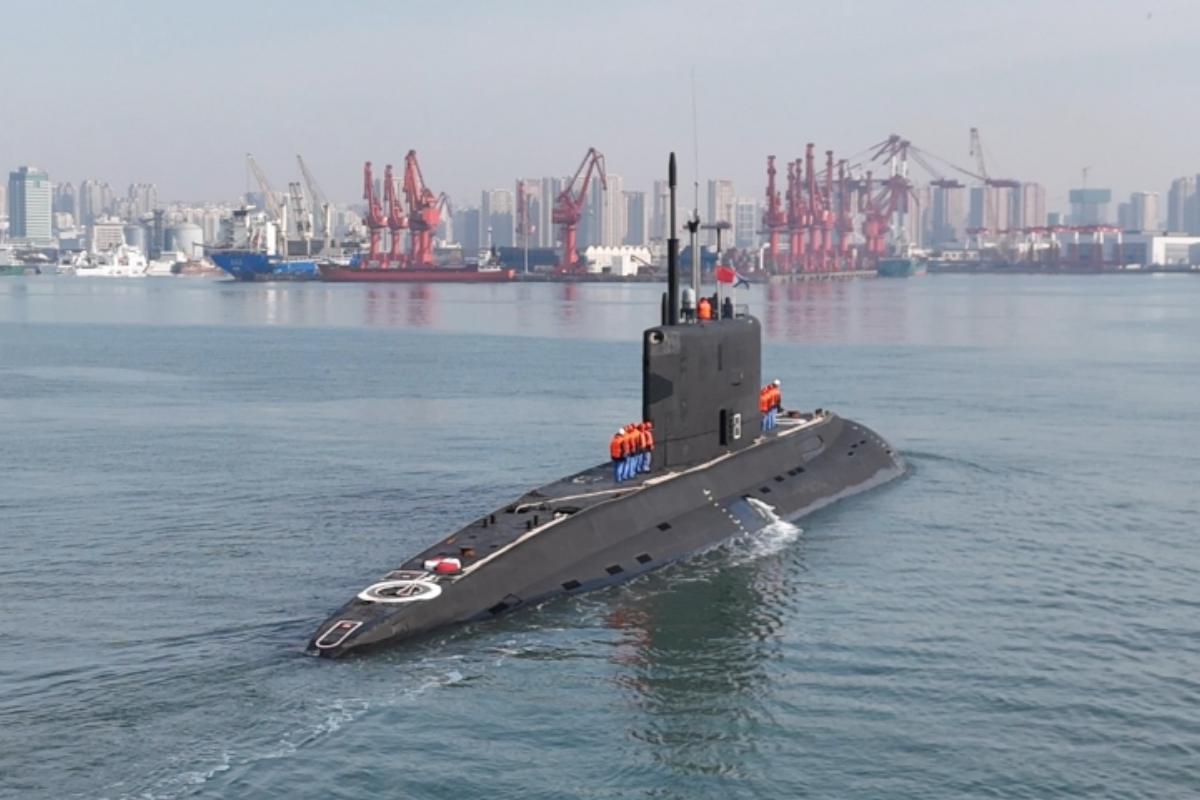
Ufa visiting Qingdao, China, 2024

While it was moving on the surface through the exclusive economic zone of the Philippines in late November, about 80 miles off Occidental Mindoro province, the Philippine Navy and Air Force dispatched ships and aircraft to follow it. The submarine commander spoke to the Philippine frigate Jose Rizal by radio, stating they were on their way to Vladivostok. President Bongbong Marcos later called the presence of the Russian submarine "concerning". Ufa later passed between the Japanese islands of Yonaguni and Iriomote to enter the East China Sea, and was tracked by the Japan Maritime Self-Defense Force oiler Hamana and a Lockheed P-3 Orion from Okinawa. Ufa visited Qingdao, China, on 9 December, and arrived at Vladivostok on 19 December 2024.

Ufa became part of the Pacific Fleet's 19th Submarine Brigade, based in Vladivostok. The submarine conducted a training exercise in the Sea of Japan on 24 March 2025, firing Kalibr cruise missiles at multiple sea and coastal targets from the range of over 1,000 kilometers. After another assignment, on 3 July 2025 Ufa returned to Vladivostok after spending forty days at sea in the Pacific Fleet area of responsibility. In July 2026, Ufa was part of a Pacific Fleet task force participating in exercises with the Chinese Navy.
