= Ralph H. Johnson =

United States Marine and Medal of Honor recipient (1949–1968)

Ralph Henry Johnson
- Born: January 11, 1949; Charleston, South Carolina, US
- Died: March 5, 1968 (aged 19) near An Hoa Combat Base, South Vietnam
- Military career
- Allegiance: United States
- Branch: United States Marine Corps
- Service years: 1967–1968
- Rank: Private First Class
- Units: Company A, 1st Reconnaissance Battalion, 1st Marine Division
- Conflicts: Vietnam War †
- Awards: Medal of Honor; Purple Heart

Ralph Henry Johnson (January 11, 1949 – March 5, 1968) was a United States Marine who posthumously received the Medal of Honor for heroism in March 1968 during the Vietnam War. When a hand grenade was thrown into his fighting hole, he immediately covered it with his body—absorbing the full impact of the blast—sacrificing his life to save a fellow Marine and preventing the enemy from penetrating his patrol perimeter.

== Biography ==
Ralph Johnson was born on January 11, 1949, in Charleston, South Carolina. He attended Courtney Elementary School and C.A. Brown High School in Charleston, South Carolina.

Johnson enlisted in the U.S. Marine Corps Reserve at Oakland, California, on March 23, 1967, and was discharged to enlist in the regular Marine Corps on July 2, 1967.

Upon completion of recruit training with the 1st Recruit Training Battalion, Recruit Training Regiment, MCRD San Diego, California, in September 1967, he was transferred to the Camp Pendleton, California. He underwent individual combat training with Company Y, 3rd Battalion, 2nd Infantry Regiment, and basic infantry training with the Basic Infantry Training Company, 2nd Infantry Training Regiment, completing the latter in November 1967. He was promoted to private first class on November 1, 1967.

In January 1968, he arrived in the Republic of Vietnam, and served as a reconnaissance scout with Company A, 1st Reconnaissance Battalion, 1st Marine Division.

On March 5, 1968, while on Operation Rock, a four-day operation by the 3rd Battalion 7th Marines in the "Arizona Territory" northwest of An Hoa Combat Base, his 15-man reconnaissance patrol was attacked by a platoon-sized enemy force on Hill 146 in the Quan Duc Duc Valley. When a hand grenade landed in the fighting hole he shared with fellow Marines, he yelled a warning and immediately hurled his body over the explosive charge. Absorbing the full impact of the blast, he was killed instantly. His heroic actions on that day were recognized with a posthumous award of the United States' highest military decoration, the Medal of Honor.

== Decorations and honors ==
=== Military decorations ===
A complete list of his medals and decorations includes: the Medal of Honor, the Purple Heart, the National Defense Service Medal, the Vietnam Service Medal with two bronze stars, the Vietnamese Cross of Gallantry with Palm, the Vietnamese Military Merit Medal, and the Republic of Vietnam Campaign Medal.

	Medal of Honor	
Purple Heart	National Defense Service Medal	Vietnam Service Medal with two bronze stars
Vietnam Military Merit Medal	Vietnam Gallantry Cross with palm	Vietnam Campaign Medal

=== Honors ===
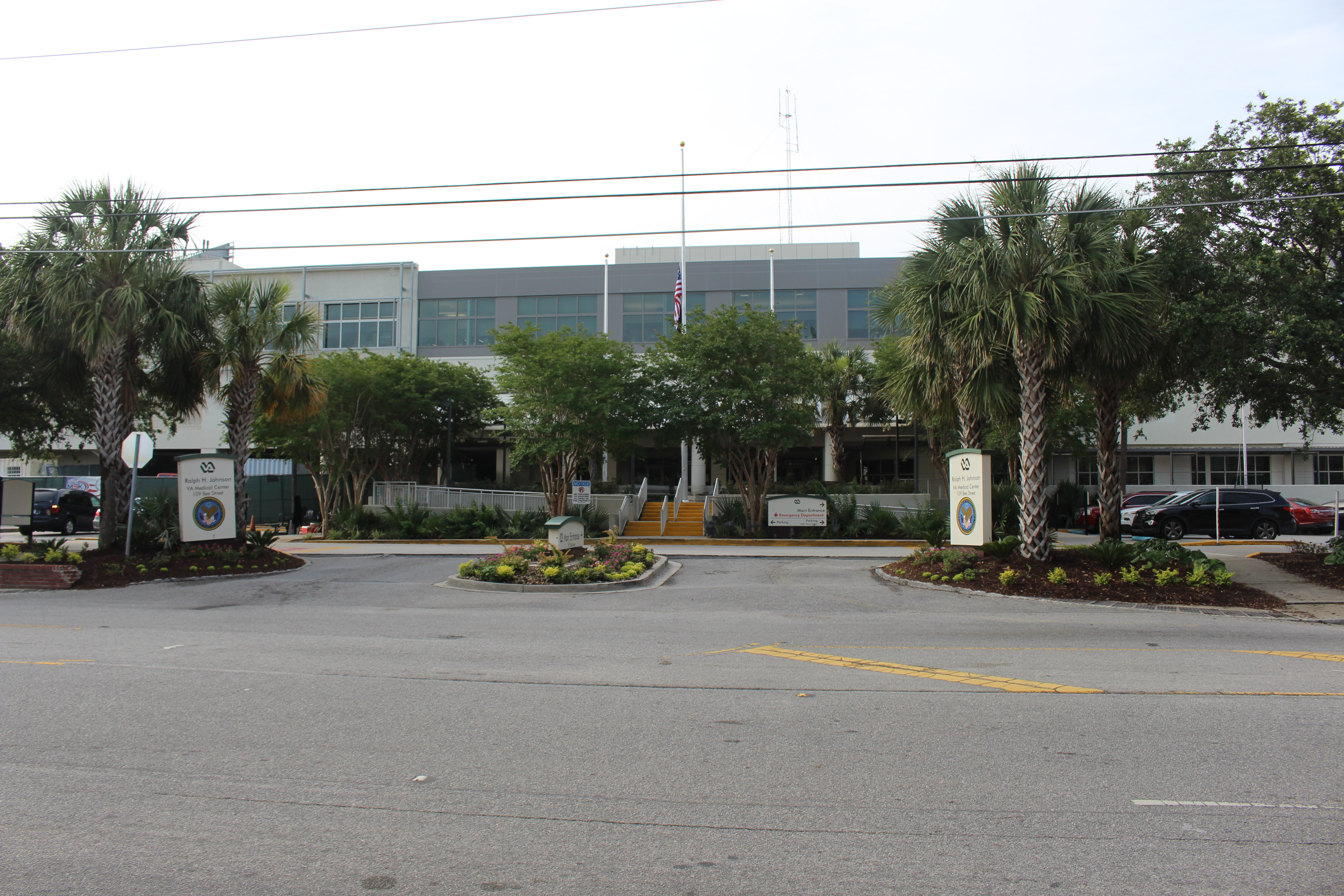
Ralph H. Johnson VA Medical Center

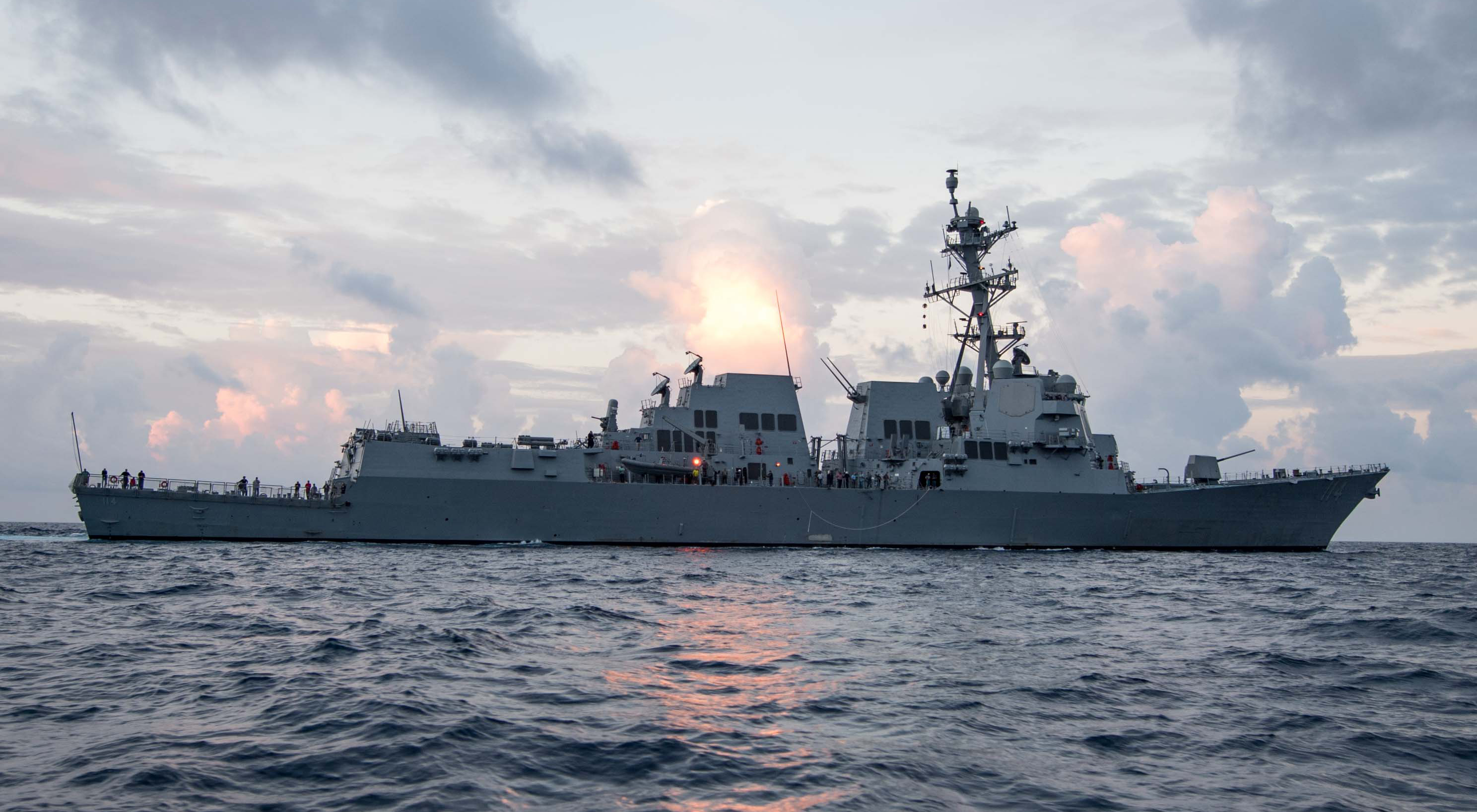
USS Ralph Johnson

The Ralph H. Johnson VA Medical Center in Charleston, South Carolina, formerly the Charleston VA Medical Center, was renamed in honor of PFC Johnson, with a formal dedication on September 5, 1991. Johnson's Medal of Honor, along with his Medal of Honor citation and a portrait of him, is framed and on public display at the Ralph H. Johnson VA Medical Center's front lobby.

On February 15, 2012, the Navy announced that a new Arleigh Burke-class guided missile destroyer would be named USS Ralph Johnson in his honor. The warship arrived at the Port of Charleston's Columbus Street Terminal on March 19, 2018, and was commissioned on March 24, 2018.

In 2026, the International African American Museum added to their permanent display, the American flag presented to Johnson's family at his burial, as well as his military medals and other personal artifacts.

Johnson's name is inscribed on the Vietnam Veterans Memorial ("The Wall") in Washington, D.C., on Panel 43E, Line 008.

== Medal of Honor citation ==
The President of the United States takes pride in presenting the MEDAL OF HONOR posthumously to

PRIVATE FIRST CLASS RALPH H. JOHNSON
UNITED STATES MARINE CORPS

for service as set forth in the following CITATION:

For conspicuous gallantry and intrepidity at the risk of his life above and beyond the call of duty while serving as a reconnaissance scout with Company A, First Reconnaissance Battalion, First Marine Division in action against the North Vietnamese Army and Viet Cong forces in the Republic of Vietnam. In the early morning hours of March 5, 1968, during OPERATION ROCK, First Class Johnson was a member of a fifteen-man reconnaissance patrol manning an observation post on Hill 146 overlooking the Quan Duc Valley deep in enemy controlled territory. They were attacked by a platoon-size hostile force employing automatic weapons, satchel charges and hand grenades. Suddenly a hand grenade landed in the three- man fighting hole occupied by Private First Class Johnson and two fellow Marines. Realizing the inherent danger to his comrades, he shouted a warning and unhesitatingly hurled himself upon the explosive device. When the grenade exploded, Private First Class Johnson absorbed the tremendous impact of the blast and was killed instantly. His prompt and heroic act saved the life of one Marine at the cost of his own and undoubtedly prevented the enemy from penetrating his sector of the patrol's perimeter. Private First Class Johnson's courage inspiring valor and selfless devotion to duty were in keeping with the highest traditions of the Marine Corps and the United States Naval Service. He gallantly gave his life for his country.

/S/ RICHARD M. NIXON

== See also ==
- List of Medal of Honor recipients
- List of Medal of Honor recipients for the Vietnam War
