= USS Ralph Johnson =

Arleigh Burke-class destroyer

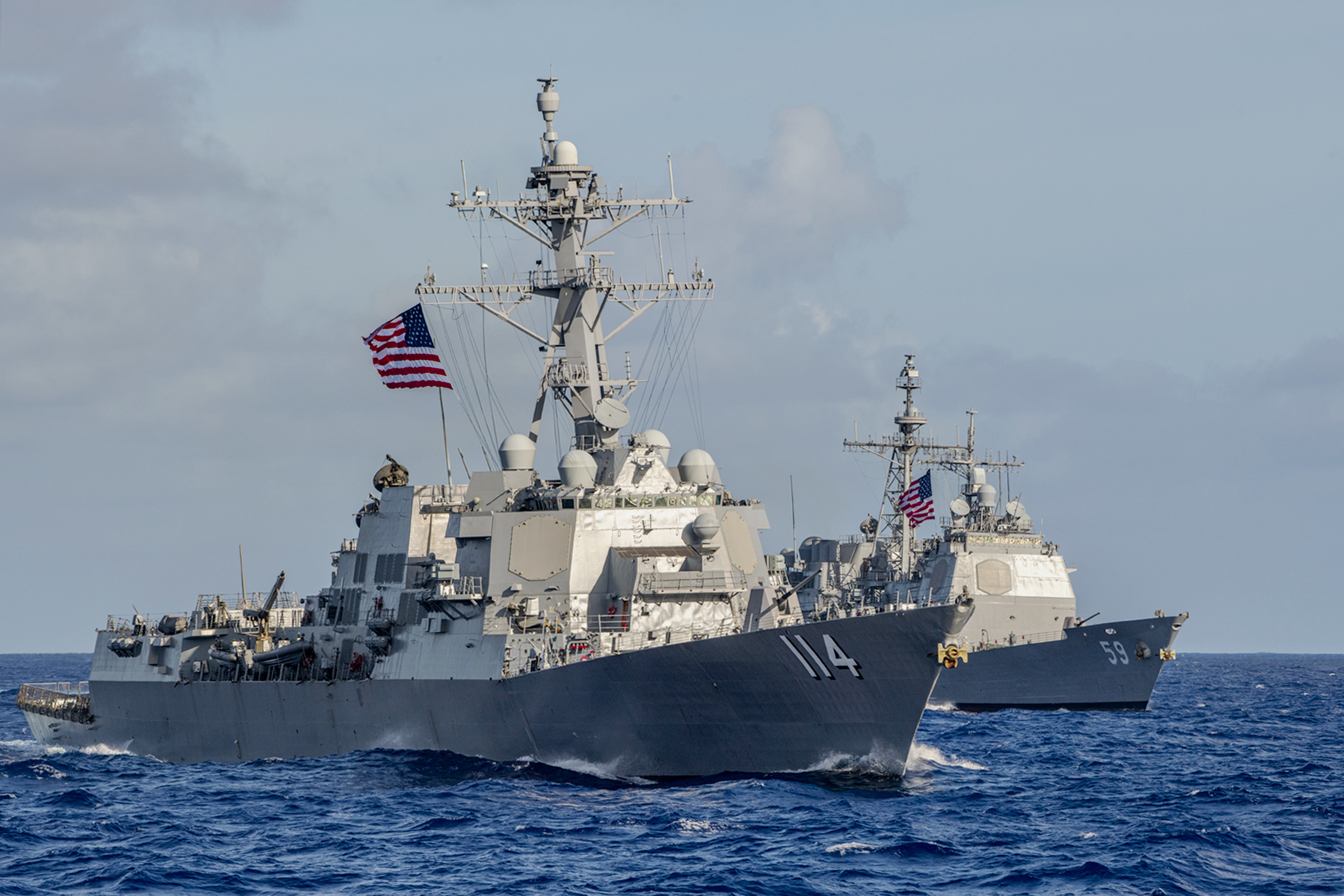
- USS Ralph Johnson and USS Princeton in June 2020

History

United States
- Name: Ralph Johnson
- Namesake: Ralph H. Johnson
- Ordered: 26 September 2011
- Builder: Ingalls Shipbuilding
- Laid down: 12 September 2014
- Launched: 12 December 2015
- Sponsored by: Georgeann Brady McRaven
- Christened: 2 April 2016
- Acquired: 15 November 2017
- Commissioned: 24 March 2018
- Home port: Yokosuka
- Identification: MMSI number: 368926268; Hull number: DDG-114
- Motto: Celer Silens Mortalis (Swift Silent Deadly)
- Status: in active service
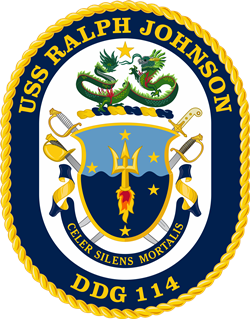
- Badge

General characteristics
- Class & type: Arleigh Burke-class destroyer
- Displacement: 9,217 tons (full load)
- Length: 513 feet (156 m)
- Beam: 66 feet (20 m)
- Propulsion: 4 × General Electric LM2500 gas turbines (100,000 shp)
- Speed: 30 kn (56 km/h; 35 mph)
- Complement: 380 officers and enlisted
- Armament: Guns: 1 × 5-inch (127 mm)/62 Mk 45 Mod 4 (lightweight gun); 1 × 20 mm (0.8 in) Phalanx CIWS; 2 × 25 mm (0.98 in) Mk 38 machine gun system; 4 × 0.50 in (12.7 mm) caliber guns; Missiles: 1 × 32-cell, 1 × 64-cell (96 total cells) Mk 41 vertical launching system (VLS): RIM-66M surface-to-air missile; RIM-156 surface-to-air missile; RIM-174A Standard ERAM; RIM-161 anti-ballistic missile; RIM-162 ESSM (quad-packed); BGM-109 Tomahawk cruise missile; RUM-139 vertical launch ASROC; Torpedoes: 2 × Mark 32 triple torpedo tubes: Mark 46 lightweight torpedo; Mark 50 lightweight torpedo; Mark 54 lightweight torpedo
- Aircraft carried: 2 × MH-60R Seahawk helicopters
- Aviation facilities: Double hangar and helipad

USS Ralph Johnson (DDG-114) is an Arleigh Burke-class (Flight IIA Restart) Aegis guided missile destroyer of the United States Navy. She was commissioned on 24 March 2018.

== Construction and career ==
The contract to build the destroyer was awarded on 26 September 2011 to Ingalls Shipbuilding of Pascagoula, Mississippi. On 15 February 2012, Secretary of the Navy Ray Mabus announced the ship was to be named Ralph Johnson in honor of Marine Ralph H. Johnson, who was posthumously awarded the Medal of Honor for shielding two fellow Marines from a grenade in March 1968 during the Vietnam War. The contract was worth $697.6 million fixed price, and was also the 30th Arleigh Burke-class destroyer contract issued to Ingalls Shipbuilding.

Ralph Johnson is the 64th ship of the Arleigh Burke class of destroyers, the first of which, USS Arleigh Burke, was commissioned in July 1991. With 75 ships planned to be built in total, the class has the longest production run for any U.S. Navy surface combatant. As an Arleigh Burke-class ship, Ralph Johnson's roles included anti-aircraft, anti-submarine, and anti-surface warfare, as well as strike operations. During the long production run, the class was built in three flights—Flight I (DDG-51–DDG-71), Flight II (DDG-72–DDG-78), and Flight IIA (DDG-79– ). Ralph Johnson is a Flight IIA ship, and as such, features several improvements in terms of ballistic missile defence, an embarked air wing, and the inclusion of mine-detecting ability.

In 2008, the U.S. Navy decided to restart production of the Arleigh Burke class as the number of orders for the Zumwalt-class destroyer was reduced from ten to three. The first three ships (DDG-113—DDG-115) ordered following the product decision are known as the "restart" ships, while "technology insertion" ships (DDG-116—DDG-123) are expected to incorporate certain elements of Arleigh Burke class Flight III, which in turn will run from DDG-124 onwards. As a "restart" ship, Ralph Johnson primarily features upgraded electronics; she was originally scheduled to be delivered in August 2016, but construction was delayed and delivery was rescheduled for late 2017 after sea trials were completed in the middle of the year.

The warship arrived at the Port of Charleston's Columbus Street Terminal on 19 March 2018 and was commissioned on 24 March.

In 2019, Ralph Johnson's homeport shifted to Yokosuka, Japan, replacing USS Mustin.

On 4 September 2023, Ralph Johnson conducted a bilateral sail with BRP Jose Rizal of the Philippine Navy in the South China Sea.

== Awards ==
- Battle "E" – (2020)
- Chief of Naval Operations (CNO) Ship-Helicopter Safety Award - (2020)
- Retention Excellence Award - (2020)
