= Subic rape case =

Court case alleging 4 U.S. marines raped a Filipina woman

The Subic rape case, officially known as People of the Philippines v. Dominic Duplantis, Keith Silkwood, and Daniel Smith, was a criminal case in the Philippines involving a Filipina and four United States marines. It caught wide media coverage and achieved political and international significance because of the Visiting Forces Agreement (VFA) between the United States and the Philippines, which had been the subject of protests from the beginning.

Initially, the accuser, Suzette Nicolas, alleged that she was gang raped but after a few days, she then said that only Lance Corporal Daniel Smith raped her. She said that just before midnight of November 1, 2005, Smith raped her inside a moving Hyundai Starex van at Alava Pier in the Subic Bay Freeport where the Marines' ship was docked. Nicolas also alleged that Smith's other companions, Lance Corporals Keith Silkwood were inside the van cheering Smith on as it happened. Smith countered the charges saying that what occurred between him and Nicolas was consensual sex.

On December 4, 2006, after numerous court hearings over the course of a year that were open to the public and the media, Judge Benjamin Pozon of the Makati Regional Trial Court Branch 139 found Smith guilty of rape, sentencing him to reclusión perpetua, a sentence of 40 years, while the three others were acquitted. Smith was confined in the United States Embassy in Manila, despite the judge's order that he be confined in a Philippine jail, and despite protests from Nicolas's supporters.

On March 17, 2009, Suzette's mother submitted an affidavit from Suzette dated March 12, 2009, saying she wasn't sure that she was raped. There was speculation of corruption and several organisations and congress people demanded an investigation. Following the submission of the affidavit, on April 23, 2009, the Court of Appeals headed by three Filipino female Justices, Associate Justices Monina Arevalo-Zenarosa, Remedios Salazar-Fernando and Myrna Dimaranan-Vidal, reversed the decision of the lower court and ordered Smith's immediate release, stating that "...a careful and judicious perusal of the evidence on record does not convince the prudent mind about the moral certainty of the guilt of the accused, hence we must acquit." The Court of Appeals stated that "If Nicole was really drunk, she would have had a hard time rising up, much more standing up, or she would have just dropped, a common experience among Filipino girls." The CA rejected the trial court's findings that "there may be forcible entry" to explain the injuries in Nicole's genitals.

== Background ==
Nicole, who grew up in the Southern Command in Zamboanga City, was invited to Subic Bay by a friend, US Navy Petty Officer Christopher Mills, together with her stepsister, Anna Liza. Mills was a family friend whom they met in Zamboanga, where joint US-Philippine military exercises had been held over the years. Nicole's family operated a canteen which was frequented by soldiers. Nicole, a management accounting graduate, managed the said canteen and in the process befriended military personnel, including Mills and her boyfriend, Brian Goodrich of the 12th Marines Operations Platoon which is based in Okinawa.

Upon the invitation of Mills, and with Goodrich's knowledge, Nicole and Anna Liza flew to Manila and then travelled to Subic Bay. On the night of November 1, 2005, after eating pizza for dinner, Mills invited the two women to the Neptune Bar for drinks. Mills later left the bar, leaving Nicole and Anna Liza behind in the company of other marines, dancing and having more drinks. Forty-five minutes later, Mills returned and found only Anna Liza who had been looking for the missing Nicole. The two then started a search for her.

Around this time, Nicole had been found at the Alavar Pier. She was found extremely drunk and crying with her jeans worn inside out and a condom sticking out of her underwear. Several witnesses surfaced, from the security guard of the bar who saw Smith carrying a drunk Nicole to the van to several other people who saw the marines dumping Nicole at the pier and including the driver of the van rented by the marines. At first, the driver, Timoteo Soriano Jr., accused the marines of raping Nicole. Later, he retracted his statement saying he was forced by police to sign the affidavit accusing the marines. When the marines were questioned, they denied the charges. Smith claimed that he and Nicole had had consensual sex.

Two other accused marines were released from custody after they were able to prove they were buying pizza at the time of the incident and were not in the van.

== Trial ==
As soon as the Philippine Department of Justice started working on the case, it became clear that the rape case and the custody issue of the marines had political significance. During the course of trial, in accordance with the terms of the VFA, the accused were in the custody of the U.S. Embassy. Throughout the trial, the issue of U.S. vs. Philippine custody on the accused U.S. marines was the focus of street demonstrations and protests by political groups and women's rights advocates, and it was a hot news item in the Philippine press.

However, some Filipinos and expatriates believe that Suzette was just an extortionist, whose rape story was just a lie which militants were willing to use to pressure the government on the US-RP Visiting Forces Agreement. Before the court found Smith guilty, columnist Sassy Lawyer of the Manila Standard, lawyer and columnist Connie Veneracion wrote, "One of the popular theories going around is that this is a case of extortion...", concluding, "Without passing on the truth or falsity of such a claim..., extortion is a matter for the defense to establish as a clear motive supported by relevant evidence. Character is not sufficient evidence. Only those without real evidence rely on guesswork, innuendoes and trial by publicity."

== Conviction ==
Lance Corporal Daniel Smith was found guilty beyond reasonable doubt of rape by the Makati Regional Trial Court Branch 139 on December 4, 2006. The court found him guilty on the premise that Suzette was severely intoxicated that night and was therefore deprived of reason to consent to sex and incapable of sensing or fighting off danger. The court relied on the definition of rape in Article 335 of the Revised Penal Code, which says:

ART. 335. When and how rape is committed Rape is committed by having carnal knowledge of a woman under any of the following circumstances:

1. By using force or intimidation 2. When the woman is deprived of reason or otherwise unconscious 3. When the woman is under twelve years of age or is demented.

Suzette's blood alcohol level that night, as revealed by the Blood Alcohol Content (BAC) approximation that was calculated by a team of toxicologists led by Dr. Kenneth Hartigan Go, was pegged at 400 mg/dL-445 mg/dL at its peak that night. However, a BAC test was never conducted on Suzette but it was based on her behavioral manifestations as reported by witnesses and on Suzette's own accounts of the drinks she had consumed that night.

Lance Corporals Keith Silkwood and Dominic Duplantis and Staff Sergeant Chad Carpentier were acquitted due to lack of evidence.

Smith later appealed the case to the Court of Appeals.

== Recantation ==
On March 17, 2009, Suzette's mother submitted an affidavit from Suzette dated March 12, 2009, saying she wasn't sure that she was raped. She said that her conscience had been bothering her and that she wanted to move on with her life. She also fired her lawyer, Evalyn Ursua.

Some Philippine solons, notably Senator Loren Legarda, expressed a different view. In a press statement, Legarda pinpointed her perception of the role of the US in Suzette's decision.

America's act of buying Nicole's silence is a precedent. They are bound to do this every time. While America keeps its processes intact and its soldiers protected, our morality as a nation is trampled upon, our justice system spat on.

On February 8, 2009, St. Louis, Missouri's online news, STL today, featured an interview article of Smith's parents, Jim and Donna Smith, wherein they said that they believe that Daniel Smith was innocent of the rape charges. They also said that his case became a pawn in a political drama and that the case was not about Smith and Suzette anymore.

Senator Ana Consuelo "Jamby" Madrigal, a Suzette supporter, believes "perhaps there was a deal [that was] too good to refuse". Suzette's lawyer, Evalyn Ursua suspects that the Malacanang Palace (Philippine President's Office) could be behind the issuance affidavit.

On the contrary, Executive Secretary Eduardo Ermita said that the recantation had come as a surprise to the government and that the government had nothing to do with it. Speaker Prospero "Boy" Nograles Jr. and Marikina Congressman Marcelino Teodoro said that politicizing the issue through baseless charges would not help the country. Speaker Nograles also said that, "It's the victim's sole and very personal decision here. The woman is old enough and intelligent enough to make up her own mind. Why should Palace be involved when it was trying to get justice for the victim?". Congressman Teodoro added that the allegations of Lawyer Ursua that the Malacanang Palace had a hand in the retraction should be proven.

Suzette's mother said that nobody pressured Nicole. She also said that it was unlikely that they would ask for help from the Philippine Government because "the government has never helped us."

Suzette's mother said Suzette left the Philippines in mid-March for the US for good to join her fiancé of two years who is in the US Military and that she had been working on obtaining her US visa for a long time. According to Ninoy Aquino International Airport and Philippine Bureau of Immigration, Suzette flew to Japan and that they didn't have a record of her connecting flight to the US. Susan appealed to the public to allow Suzette to live a normal life.

According to Justice Secretary Raul Gonzalez, all he knew was that Suzette wanted assistance from the Philippine Government in securing a visa for Italy where her brother reportedly stays. He also said that Suzette could face a perjury case for lying under oath which was contradicted by House Foreign Affairs Committee Chairman Antonio Cuenco. Chairman Cuenco said that since Suzette had doubts on what she said during the trial, that didn't make her a perjurer.

Justice Secretary Gonzalez further stated that he should have granted Suzette's wish to remove the "meaty" portions of her affidavit in 2005 when she filed the rape case against Smith. He also added that if he helped her in removing those portions, there "never" would have been a case.

He added that he suspects that anti-US military groups in the country might have originally pressured and "brainwashed" Suzette to pursue the alleged rape charges against Smith and that everybody was "taken for a ride."

Secretary Gonzalez added that maybe Suzette's lawyer, Evalyn Ursua, and the groups who were supporting Suzette told her to pursue the alleged rape case. He added that if Ursua will be found guilty of perjury and for offering false testimony, she could be penalized from prison mayor (six to 20 years) to reclusion perpetua (40 years).

Secretary Gonzalez also said that Suzette's recantation statement won't hold water because her affidavit is just a scrap of paper. He also added that Suzette's affidavit may not be admitted as new evidence because it should have been introduced during the 2006 trial.

Interior Undersecretary Marius Corpus said that Daniel Smith will not be cleared of the rape case and cannot go until the Court of Appeals junk the case. The case was in Court of Appeals for more than 2 years wherein Smith had always insisted that there was a consensual sex between him and Suzette. The last time Interior Undersecretary Corpus visited Smith in US Embassy in February 2009, he said that Smith told him that he was innocent of the rape case and that there was a misappreciation of the facts by the trial court.

Zambales Congresswoman Mitos Magsaysay, member of Arroyo's administration party and whose district covers where the incident occurred, said that Suzette did not originally complain of rape when she talked to her on November 1, 2005 (the day of the incident). Congresswoman Magsaysay also said that the new affidavit that Suzette submitted is consistent on what Suzette, the Starex van driver Timoteo Soriano, Suzette's sister and the other witnesses told her at the time. She also said that the concern of Suzette then was her mother's anger that she stayed out late that night. Congresswoman Magsaysay further stated that it is very obvious that some people took over and influenced Suzette to sue Smith for rape and that there were some changes on the details of the incident on the affidavit that Suzette filed in 2005, apparently by individuals and groups who have vested interest on the case.

On the other hand, a women's rights group, EnGende Rights, believe that Suzette's affidavit "'should not be given weight'" because the timing is not only "suspicious", but also because Philippine Supreme Court decisions in a lot of cases show that witness recantations are not given weight.

On May 24, 2009, Suzette's former lawyer Evalyn Ursua, Former Senator Leticia Ramos-Shahani and the militant groups Gabriela and Bagong Alyansang Makabayan filed a petition to Supreme Court to investigate Suzette's recantation affidavit. The petition to investigate the affidavit was approved by Chief Justice Reynato Puno on May 25, 2009. The group also asked the Supreme Court to stop the Court of Appeals from resolving Smith's appeal pending the result of the investigation that they were seeking.

Meanwhile, Suzette's mother, Susan Nicolas, was angry and called on Suzette's former lawyer, Evalyn Ursua, and like-minded groups and individuals to stop initiating action on the case.

Susan also demanded to know why Ursua was "asking for an investigation when we were the ones who approached [Smith's lawyers] so we can get the [P100,000 court-awarded civil damages] intended for us." Pertaining to Ursua, Suzette's mother added, "What does she want to happen? I'm really angry. Why can't she just accept that we don't want her services anymore?"

Philippine Supreme Court Rule 121 Section 2b of Criminal Law Procedures states that the court shall grant a new trial if a new and material evidence has been discovered which the accused could not with reasonable diligence have discovered and produced at the trial and which if introduced and admitted would probably change the judgment.

The leftists and militant groups Gabriela (with Lisa Maza and Luzviminda Ilagan), Bayan Muna (with Teodoro "Teddy" Casino, Joel Virador and Satur Ocampo), Akbayan (with Riza Hontiveros), EnGende Rights (with Clara Rita Padilla), Volunteers Against Crimes and Corruptions (with Dante Jimenez), Bagong Alyansang Makabayan (with Renato Reyes Jr.), Task Force Subic (with Princess Nemenzo), The Public Interest Law, Quezon Congressman Lorenzo Tañada III, Senators Ana Consuelo "Jamby" Madrigal, Loren Legarda, Pia Cayetano, Rodolfo Biazon, Francis Escudero, Manny Villar and Francis Pangilinan, Quezon City Congressman Matias Defensor and Congresswoman Nanette Castelo-Daza, Albay Congressman Edcel Lagman, Makati Mayor Jejomary Binay, Dr. Quintin Doromal, Lawyers Evalyn Ursua, Romulo Capulong and Harry Roque, Clara Padilla, and Former Senators Jovito Salonga, Francisco Tatad and Wigberto Tanada were among Suzette's supporters on her rape lawsuit against Smith and they are known to be anti-VFA.

According to Smith's lawyer, Jose Justiniano, Suzette's family contacted him on March 12, 2009, and asked for a meeting with him and the other lawyer who is also representing Smith. Suzette told them that she fired her lawyer and that she wished to accept the 100,000 Pesos (equivalent to US$2000) that Judge Pozon ordered Smith to pay her for moral and compensatory damages in December 2006.

At the time of Smith's sentencing, Suzette had wanted Smith to be punished of death penalty instead of the 40 year imprisonment sentence that Judge Pozon imposed.

== Acquittal ==
On March 23, 2009, Manila Times, a Philippine newspaper, published the draft acquittal of the Court of Appeals in favor of Smith even without Suzette's recantation. According to the Dizon draft ponencia Smith is "innocent beyond reasonable doubt." Court of Appeals Justice Agustin Dizon, who retired on June 27, 2008, had written that the accused should be acquitted both on the technical and substantive aspects. Dizon said that the issues of "force and intimidation" and "unconsciousness" via "intoxication" cannot be appreciated because such evidence failed to convince him to convict Smith.

In May 2008, Court of Appeals Justice Celia Librea-Leagogo, the senior member of the division, did not sign the Dizon ponencia and asked for two months to review the case. Dizon was the junior justice of the division at the time. Leagogo was "meticulous" about the Dizon draft and she allegedly feared that this might go against public opinion and the Court of Appeals might be the subject of criticism. Surprisingly, even before Dizon retired, Leagogo recused herself from handling the case, saying that she was a friend of one of Smith's lawyers. The justices who talked to Manila Times said they agreed with Dizon's draft ruling, but unfortunately, they added, he ran out of time. He was not able to hand down the ruling before reaching the mandatory retirement age of 70. These developments delayed the signing of the draft decision and forced the 17th Division to look to other members.

The case was raffled anew, with Associate Justice Juan Enriquez coming in as the new member of the court's Special Division. Enriquez, however, took the tack the others had taken for the same reason that one of Smith's counsels was his friend. He was replaced by Justice Hakim Abdulwahid. With the subsequent raffle of the case, the new ponente replacing Dizon was Zenarosa, with Justices Mariano del Castillo and Apolinario Bruselas as members. Several appellate court justices who talked to Manila Times on condition of anonymity said that most of them support the acquittal of Smith on the basis of the Dizon's draft. The Manila Time source said that the current ponente of the case, Justice Monina Arevalo-Zenarosa vowed to issue her ruling before her retirement in August 2009.

The US marine's appeal had been pending before the Court of Appeals for more than two years, stalled by the recusal and retirement of justices assigned to handle the case. On March 26, 2009, Suzette's former lawyer, Evalyn Ursua, and Suzette's supporter on her rape case against Smith, Teresita Ang-See, told Manila Times that they had asked Presiding Justice Conrado Vasquez of the appellate court to ferret out that source. Ursua said that she had filed the petition not as a lawyer for Suzette but as a citizen of the Philippines and as an officer of the court.

On April 23, 2009, the Court of Appeals (CA) reversed Smith's conviction, saying that no evidence was presented in court to show that the American had employed force, threat and intimidation on Nicole. The court ruled that Smith's sexual tryst with "Nicole" was "a spontaneous, unplanned romantic episode", and that they were "carried away by their passions." The Court of Appeals also said that "Suddenly the moment of parting came and the marines had to rush to the ship. In that situation, reality dawned on Nicole – what her audacity and reckless abandon, flirting with Smith and leading him on, brought upon her". The court said: "No evidence was introduced to show force, threat and intimidation applied by the accused upon Nicole even as prosecution vainly tried to highlight her supposed intoxication and alleged unconsciousness at the time of the sexual act."

"As in this case, a careful and judicious perusal of the evidence on record does not convince the prudent mind about the moral certainty of the guilt of the accused, hence, we must acquit," read the CA decision. The CA said the Makati Regional Trial Court ignored and overlooked circumstances surrounding the intoxication of Nicole and contusions on her body when it convicted Smith of the crime of rape. The acquittal was written by Associate Justice Monina Arevalo-Zenarosa. Two other women Associate Justices of the Court of Appeals' Special 11th Division – Remedios Salazar-Fernando and Myrna Dimaranan-Vidal – concurred with the decision.

== Rape in the Philippines ==
Rape in Philippine jurisprudence is considered a criminal offense punishable by life imprisonment.

The Anti-Rape Law of 1997, which amended the previous definition of rape as defined in the Revised Penal Code of the Philippines of 1930, defines the crime of rape as follows:

Article 266-A. Rape: When And How Committed. - Rape is committed:

1) By a man who shall have carnal knowledge of a woman under any of the following circumstances:

a) Through force, threat, or intimidation;
b) When the offended party is deprived of reason or otherwise unconscious;
c) By means of fraudulent machination or grave abuse of authority; and
d) When the offended party is under twelve (12) years of age or is demented, even though none of the circumstances mentioned above be present.

2) By any person who, under any of the circumstances mentioned in paragraph 1 hereof, shall commit an act of sexual assault by inserting his penis into another person's mouth or anal orifice, or any instrument or object, into the genital or anal orifice of another person.

On December 4, 2006, based on the evidences and witnesses' testimonies during the trial, the Makati Regional Trial Court found Lance Corporal Daniel Smith guilty of rape against Nicole. Under article 266-B of the Revised Penal Code, as amended by the Anti-Rape Law of 1997, the court sentenced Smith to reclusion perpetua and ordered his temporary detention at the Makati city jail. The custody issue was brought up by the US embassy in Manila and the Philippine Justice and Foreign Affairs departments. An agreement was then signed that as the case was not final and closed because it could be brought up to the Philippine Court of Appeals, the custody of Smith should be transferred back to the US embassy in keeping with the provisions of the VFA. The Makati Regional Trial Court reiterated its decision to detain Smith at the city jail temporarily.

The custody issue was brought up to the Philippine Court of Appeals and on January 4, 2007, the court said that the dispute could not be decided upon because a new agreement that had resulted in Smith's midnight transfer back to the US Embassy had rendered the case moot. The agreement referred was that signed by Philippine Foreign Secretary Alberto Romulo and US Ambassador Kristie Kenney on December 22 stating that Smith should be held at the US Embassy compound. Smith was transferred back to the US Embassy on December 29—seven days after the agreement had been signed.

The appellate court also affirmed Judge Benjamin Pozon's decision to detain Smith at the city jail temporarily. The court upheld Philippine exclusive jurisdiction over a convict and that the convict should be detained in a Philippine facility. By this decision, the court asserted the power of the Philippine government over US troops. As much as the court found itself disagreeing with the executive branch of the Philippine Government and the US Embassy on the custody issue, it decided to leave it up to the government to decide.

Appellate court Justice Apolinario Bruselas Jr. wrote in his 38-page ruling: "Courts may not directly intervene in the exercise of diplomacy no matter how proudly or meekly, strongly or weakly, such exercise may be conducted by the appropriate political organ of government." Explaining this, Brusales paraphrased former Associate Justice of the U.S. Supreme Court Oliver Wendell Holmes Jr. by saying "... as Justice Holmes once wisely observed, the other branches of Government are the ultimate guardians of the liberties and welfare of the people in quite as great a degree as the courts." The Court of Appeals cited the case of Missouri, Kansas and Texas Railroad Co. vs. May as the source of the quote. It developed, however, that Holmes had actually written it as "... legislatures are ultimate guardians of the liberties and welfare of the people in quite as great a degree as the courts." The quote, apparently, originated from a dissenting opinion written by Justice John M. Harlan II, wherein he quoted Holmes as if the word "legislatures" meant the "other branches of the Government".

While the appellate court found the case moot, in the sense of "not worthy of consideration or discussion because it has been resolved or no longer needs to be resolved", others believe that the case is still open for discussions and debates.

In June 2008, the Manila Times reported that, due to the scheduled mandatory June 27 retirement of Associate Justice Agustin Dizon, the reviewing justice of the Court of Appeals 16th Division, which is handling the rape case, the hearings may have to start from the beginning after a replacement reviewing justice is assigned. Quoting sources at the court, the Times said, "'The new reviewing justice can't just take over the notes and draft report of the case. He or she will have to start from scratch,' the source explained.". The Times explained, "hearings may have to start from the beginning to avoid possible accusations of partiality by the new justice assigned."

The Times also reported that case has become so controversial that appellate justices seem to be avoiding it. One after another, justices assigned to the 16th division have recused themselves from the case. According to the Times, Associate Justice Vicente Veloso quit as head of that division because his daughter is a member of the law firm defending Smith; Associate Justice Celia Librea-Leagogo recused herself, citing her friendship with one of the lawyers of Smith; Associate Justice Apolinario Bruselas Jr., was expected to recuse himself because he wrote a Court of Appeals decision on the custody of Smith. Finally, the Times reported speculation that the decision would likely turn in favor of Smith because of President Gloria Arroyo's upcoming US trip, where she is scheduled to meet with President George W. Bush.

In September 2008, questions were raised about whether or not Smith was still in detention in the embassy. This led to a surprise visit to the embassy by the head of the presidential commission on the Visiting Forces Agreement, which confirmed that Smith was still in detention there.

On September 19, 2008, attorneys representing Nicole's filed an indirect contempt motion against the government's transfer of Smith from Makati city jail in December 2006, to the Embassy of the United States in Manila. During the oral arguments, Associate Justice Presbeterio Velasco raised the possibility that the petitioners represented by Agabin could be liable for forum shopping because they had also filed another petition related to the Smith case before the Court of Appeals. Agabin said his clients’ complaint before the Supreme Court was different from that before the appellate court. During those arguments Pacifico Agabin, attorney for the petitioners, argued the questions (1) whether the right to custody of Daniel Smith during the pendency of his appeal belongs to the Philippine government or US authorities and (2) whether there was contempt of court committed in the transfer of the accused from the custody of the courts to that of the US authorities pending appeal. The petition also argued that the agreement between Foreign Affairs Secretary Alberto Romulo and US Ambassador to the Philippines Kristie Kenney transferring the custody of Smith to US authorities was unconstitutional, and contended that the Visiting Forces Agreement (VFA) violates the exclusive power of the Philippine Supreme Court to promulgate rules and procedures in all courts under the 1987 Constitution.

On February 11, 2009, The Supreme Court of the Philippines sitting en banc decided 9-4 "The Visiting Forces Agreement (VFA) between the Republic of the Philippines and the United States, entered into on February 10, 1998, is UPHELD as constitutional, the Romulo-Kenney Agreements of December 19 and 22, 2006 are DECLARED not in accordance with the VFA, and respondent Secretary of Foreign Affairs is hereby ordered to forthwith negotiate with the United States representatives for the appropriate agreement on detention facilities under Philippine authorities as provided in Art. V, Sec. 10 of the VFA, pending which the status quo shall be maintained until further orders by this Court."

== Implications ==
=== Visiting Forces Agreement ===
The RP-US Visiting Forces Agreement, or VFA, is a 1999 agreement between the Philippines and the United States building on the 1951 US-Philippines Mutual Defense Treaty (MDT). One article of the MDT specifies that the two countries will maintain and develop their individual and collective capacity to resist armed attack. Therefore, US and Philippine personnel visit the territory of the other to train jointly. The VFA addresses the treatment of personnel from one signatory who are accused of having committed crimes while visiting the territory of the other. Partly as a result of the Volunteers Against Crimes and Corruptions controversy growing out of this case, especially on the custody issue, the Congress of the Philippines has considered terminating the VFA. On January 9, 2006, Senator Miriam Defensor Santiago, head of the Senate Committee on Foreign Relations, introduced a draft resolution calling for the Senate of the Philippines to conduct inquiries into the matter. After first reading on January 16, 2006, the resolution was referred to two Senate committees.

Article 5 item 6 of VFA (Criminal Jurisdiction) states, in part, that:

The custody of any United States personnel over whom the Philippines is to exercise jurisdiction shall immediately reside with United States military authorities, if they so request, from the commission of the offense until completion of all judicial proceedings.(emphasis added)

=== Philippine-American relations ===
As the Philippine government struggled with what some perceive as intrusions into their sovereignty and with questions of jurisdiction over U.S. military personnel convicted of having committed crimes on Philippine soil, the U.S. strongly reiterated Philippine obligations to adhere to its obligations under the VFA. The U.S. is the biggest trading partner of the Philippines. It is also the biggest military and development aid donor to this former U.S. territory. When Smith was incarcerated under Philippine custody, the U.S. announced the cancellation of Balikatan 2007 (a joint U.S./RP military exercise which had been previously scheduled). After the Philippine government had surrendered Smith back to U.S. custody, the U.S. government later announced the resumption of the Balikatan 2007 exercise.

=== Death of Jennifer Laude ===
This case was alluded to in media publications surrounding the death of Jennifer Laude. Both cases involved a U.S. marine as a suspect and both had implications on Philippines-United States relations.

== See also ==
- Killing of Jennifer Laude
- United States bases in the Philippines
