= Philippines–Australia Status of Visiting Forces Agreement =

Bilateral agreement between the Philippines and Australia

Australian-Philippines Status of Visiting Forces Agreement
- Type: Visiting forces agreement
- Signed: May 31, 2007
- Effective: September 28, 2012
- Parties: Philippines; Australia

The Philippines–Australia Status of Visiting Forces Agreement (SOVFA) is a bilateral visiting forces agreement between the governments of the Republic of the Philippines and the Commonwealth of Australia concerning the status of armed forces from each state while in the territory of the other. A visiting forces agreement is a version of a status of forces agreement that only applies to troops temporarily in a country.

== History ==
The agreement was signed in Canberra, Australia on 31 May 2007 by Philippine Defense Secretary Hermogenes Ebdane and his Australian counterpart Defence Minister Brendan Nelson. The signing was witnessed by Philippine President Gloria Macapagal Arroyo and Australian Prime Minister John Howard.

Under Article XVIII, Section 25 of the Philippine constitution, foreign military bases, troops, or facilities may only be allowed in the Philippines under a treaty duly concurred in by the Senate. A press release issued October 3, 2007 by the Philippine Senate announced that senators Mar Roxas and Jinggoy Estrada called the attention of the Office of the President for its failure to officially transmit this agreement for Senate concurrence.

The Philippine Senate, voting 17–1, ratified the agreement on July 24, 2012. Lone dissenter Senator Joker Arroyo questioned the sudden ratification of the SOVFA, suggesting that the Philippines' unresolved territorial dispute with China may have triggered the vote. The Philippines' Department of Foreign Affairs welcomed the Senate's concurrence while Presidential Spokesperson Edwin Lacierda said in a statement that the Senate "has taken an important step in enhancing our national and regional security by ratifying the Status of Visiting Forces Agreement (SOVFA) between Australia and the Philippines."

The treaty entered into force on September 28, 2012. In November 2026, the two countries signed an updated defense cooperation agreement to facilitate implementation of the SOVFA.

== See also ==
- Status of forces agreement
- Visiting forces agreement
- Philippines–United States Visiting Forces Agreement
