= Procedural defense =

Legal defense based on challenging the legitimacy of the legal proceeding

In jurisprudence, procedural defenses are forms of defense challenging the legitimacy of the legal proceeding. A party argues that it should not be held liable for a legal charge or claim brought against them by some legal process, because it has been found such a process is illegitimate. Procedural defenses are built into legal systems as incentives for systems to follow their own rules. In common law jurisdictions, the term has applications in both criminal law and civil law. Procedural defenses do not settle questions of guilt or innocence in a criminal proceeding, and are independent of substantive findings for or against a plaintiff or defendant in a civil proceeding. As an example, defendants might claim there is something about the method of bringing them to be judged that is unable to result in justice done to someone in their situation. They might claim the process is incompatible with the goals of the justice system.

== United States ==
In the United States, procedural defenses include:

- collateral estoppel
- denial of a speedy trial
- double jeopardy
- entrapment
- prosecutorial misconduct
- selective prosecution
- exclusionary rule
- facts found by judge rather than jury
- denial or neglect of public counsel appointment
- no opportunity to impugn witnesses against you
- breaches of due process, such as precedent established in Rhode Island v. Innis (1980) or Miranda v. Arizona (1966)
- denial of a jury trial in a civil case

Traditional procedural defenses in "equity" in the U.S. and other common law jurisdictions:

- laches
- estoppel

== England and Wales ==
In criminal trials in England and Wales, the courts have inherent jurisdiction to end or stay prosecutions for abuse of process when it would be unfair to try a case. Defendants can apply to have a prosecution ended or stayed as an abuse of process. There is no specific set of criteria when abuse of process can be invoked by a defendant, but commonly recognised categories include delays that would cause prejudice to a defendant, evidence having been lost or destroyed or otherwise not properly obtained, disclosure failures, entrapment, the breach of a promise or legitimate expectation of non-prosecution, double jeopardy, or manipulation of procedure by prosecutors. The special pleas of autrefois convict and autrefois acquit also bring about an end to criminal proceedings, although the Criminal Justice Act 2003 introduced statutory exceptions to the common law rule of double jeopardy.

== See also ==
- legal technicality
- procedural justice
