= Visiting forces agreement =

International military agreement

A visiting forces agreement (VFA) is an agreement between a country and a foreign nation having military forces visiting in that country. Visiting forces agreements are similar in intent to status of forces agreements (SOFAs). A VFA typically covers forces visiting temporarily, while a SOFA typically covers forces based in the host nation as well as visiting forces.

== Agreements ==
While the United States military has the largest foreign presence and therefore accounts for most VFAs, other countries having troops temporarily serving abroad negotiate VFAs with states where they serve.

=== Terms of operation ===
VFAs are intended to clarify the terms under which foreign military is allowed to operate. Typically, a VFA is mainly concerned with the legal issues associated with military individuals and property. This may include issues like entry and exit into the country, tax liabilities, postal services, or employment terms for host-country nationals, but the most contentious issues are civil and criminal jurisdiction over the visiting forces. For civil matters, VFAs provide for how civil damages caused by the forces will be determined and paid. Criminal issues vary, but the typical provision in U.S. VFAs is that U.S. military courts will have jurisdiction over crimes committed either by a servicemember against another servicemember or by a servicemember as part of his or her military duty, but the host nation retains jurisdiction over other crimes.

=== Host nation concerns ===
In many host nations, the VFA can become a major political issue following crimes allegedly committed by visiting service members. This is especially true when the incidents involve severe crimes, such as robbery, murder, manslaughter or sex crimes, especially when the charge is defined differently between the two nations. For example, in 2005 in the Philippines, four U.S. Marines were charged with raping a local woman with whom they had been drinking. As the incident had no connection with the military duties of the accused, they were tried under Philippine law in a Philippine court, which convicted one of the accused and acquitted the others.

=== Political issues ===
Host countries may have differing perspectives on the presence of foreign troops within their territory, and public calls to renegotiate Visiting Forces Agreements (VFAs) are sometimes accompanied by broader demands for the withdrawal of foreign military personnel. Disagreements may arise due to differences in national customs, legal systems, and expectations around jurisdiction.

In some cases, concerns are raised within host nations about the level of legal immunity or protections granted to foreign service members, particularly when local legal standards differ from those in the sending country. These concerns may include the perception that local courts face limitations in exercising full jurisdiction or that certain provisions of the VFA restrict the host country’s ability to prosecute offences committed by foreign personnel.

For example, in South Korea, public debate has emerged over the legal arrangements provided under the Status of Forces Agreement (SOFA) with the United States. While some argue that the current terms limit the host nation’s legal authority, it is noted that South Korea itself maintains military personnel overseas under agreements that confer broad immunity—such as its SOFA with Kyrgyzstan, which grants full legal immunity from prosecution by local authorities.

The outcomes of legal proceedings involving foreign military personnel are interpreted in various ways. The prosecution and conviction of such individuals in local courts is sometimes viewed as an indication that legal accountability mechanisms are in place. Conversely, others may interpret these outcomes as highlighting areas where the agreement’s application is inconsistent or where improvements may be necessary to align with host country expectations.

== See also ==
- Status of forces agreement
- Visiting Forces Act
- Philippines–United States Visiting Forces Agreement
- Philippines–Australia Status of Visiting Forces Agreement
- Extraterritoriality
