= BRP Lake Caliraya =

Philippine Navy tanker

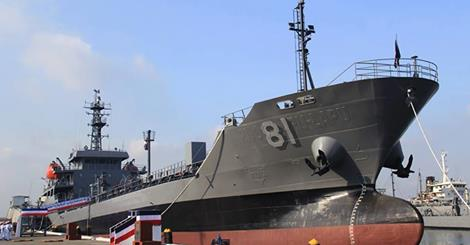
- BRP Lake Caliraya (AF-81)

History

Philippines
- Name: MT PNOC Lapu-Lapu
- Operator: PNOC Shipping and Transport Corp.
- Builder: Taizhou Zhongxing Shipyard, China
- Launched: 2007
- Completed: November 2007
- Commissioned: January 2008
- Decommissioned: 2014
- Fate: Transferred to Philippine Navy

History

Philippines
- Name: BRP Lake Caliraya (AF-81)
- Namesake: Lake Caliraya, a man-made lake in Laguna province, Philippines
- Operator: Philippine Navy
- Acquired: 26 March 2014
- Commissioned: 23 May 2015
- Decommissioned: 17 December 2020
- Identification: IMO number: 9481740; MMSI number: 547950800; Callsign: DUTR3
- Fate: Sunk as target, 8 May 2024

General characteristics
- Type: Small Replenishment Tanker
- Length: 98.95 m (324.6 ft)
- Beam: 15.62 m (51.2 ft)
- Draft: 4.6 m (15 ft)
- Sensors & processing systems: Furuno navigation radars

The BRP Lake Caliraya (AF-81) was a Philippine Navy small replenishment tanker. The ship was formerly a double-hulled oil products tanker of the now defunct Philippine National Oil Company (PNOC) Shipping and Transport Corporation, and was donated to the Philippine Navy in 2014 together with two other tankers of the company. The ship was the only Chinese-made naval asset of the Philippine Navy during its time in service.

The ship had a deadweight of 4,570 tons. It was a single product replenishment platform that has a depot-to-ship, ship-to-depot, and a ship-to-ship refueling capabilities. The ship was crewed by selected officers of the Sealift Amphibious Force.

On 17 December 2020, BRP Lake Caliraya was decommissioned alongside a naval helicopter and sixteen patrol boats. The ship has been identified as having numerous mechanical and electrical deficiencies, rendering repairs and additional work impractical.

The ship, slated as a target for a sinking exercise on July 13 as part of Marine Aviation Support Activity (MASA) 2023, ran aground in Bataan province. Philippine and US Marines intended to sink it off Naval Station Leovigildo Gantioqui but it ran aground en route to Subic, Zambales. Inclement weather prompted the cancellation of the sinking exercise, however the Marine Aviation Support Activity still continued until July 21.

On 8 May 2024, the ship was used as a target for the maritime strike exercise as part of the Balikatan military drills. Missiles and other ammunitions from Philippine and U.S. forces hit the target ship during the activity. It sank around 10:49 a.m. at about 15 kilometers off Laoag City, Ilocos Norte Province.
