= Status of forces agreement =

Form of diplomatic military agreement

A status of forces agreement (SOFA) is an agreement between a host country and a foreign nation stationing military forces in that country. SOFAs are often included, along with other types of military agreements, as part of a comprehensive security arrangement. A SOFA does not constitute a security arrangement; it establishes the rights and privileges of foreign personnel present in a host country in support of the larger security arrangement. Under international law a status of forces agreement differs from military occupation.

== Agreements ==
While the United States military has the largest foreign presence and therefore accounts for most SOFAs, the United Kingdom, France, Australia, Germany, Italy, Russia, Japan, Spain, and many other nations also station military forces abroad and negotiate SOFAs with their host countries. In the past, the Soviet Union had SOFAs with most of its satellite states. While most of the United States' SOFAs are public, some remain classified. NATO has its own procedure that stems from "a peacetime agreement originally signed in 1951" for SOFAs between member states.

=== Terms of operation ===
A SOFA is intended to clarify the terms under which the foreign military is allowed to operate. Typically, purely military operational issues such as the locations of bases and access to facilities are covered by separate agreements. A SOFA is more concerned with the legal issues associated with military individuals and property. This may include issues such as entry and exit into the country, tax liabilities, postal services, or employment terms for host-country nationals, but the most contentious issues are civil and criminal jurisdiction over bases and personnel. For civil matters, SOFAs provide for how civil damages caused by the forces will be determined and paid. Criminal issues vary, but the typical provision in U.S. SOFAs is that U.S. courts will have jurisdiction over crimes committed either by a service member against another service member or by a service member as part of his or her military duty, but the host nation retains jurisdiction over other crimes.

=== Host nation concerns ===
In many host nations, especially those with a large foreign military presence such as South Korea and Japan, the SOFA can become a major political issue following crimes allegedly committed by service members. This is especially true when the incidents involve crimes such as robbery, murder, manslaughter or sex crimes, especially when the charge is defined differently in the two nations. For example, in 2002 in South Korea, a U.S. military AVLB bridge-laying vehicle on the way to the base camp after a training exercise accidentally killed two girls. Under the SOFA, a United States military court martial tried the soldiers involved. The panel found the act to be an accident and acquitted the service members of negligent homicide, citing no criminal intent or negligence. The U.S. military accepted responsibility for the incident and paid civil damages. This resulted in widespread outrage in South Korea, demands that the soldiers be retried in a South Korean court, the airing of a wide variety of conspiracy theories, and a backlash against the local expatriate community.

As of 2011, American military authorities were allowing South Korea to charge and prosecute American soldiers in South Korean courts. Two U.S. soldiers were accused of rapes in separate incidents in October 2011, prompting the imposition of a peninsula-wide curfew for U.S. troops. A U.S. soldier was alleged to have committed arson in a bar in Seoul in November 2011, and another soldier was sentenced to three years in prison in June 2012 by a Daegu district court after being convicted of rape. Also in November 2011, a Uijeongbu district court sentenced a soldier who had been caught on camera committing an exceptionally brutal rape to ten years in prison. That same court had earlier sentenced a Korean man to less than four years in prison for the rape of a female U.S. soldier, but the disparity was explained as being due to the level of violence in the rape by the U.S. soldier. On review, the three-year sentence was suspended and the ten year sentence was upheld.

Criminal accusations against off-duty service members are generally considered subject to local jurisdiction, depending on specific provisions of the SOFA. However, details of these provisions can still prompt issues. In Japan, for example, the SOFA includes the requirement that service members are not turned over to the local authorities until they are charged in court. In a number of cases, local officials have complained that this impedes their ability to question suspects and investigate the crime. American officials allege that the Japanese police use coercive interrogation tactics and are concerned more with attaining a high conviction rate than finding "justice". American authorities also note the difference in police investigation powers, as well as the judiciary. No lawyer can be present in investigation discussions in Japan, though a translator is provided, and no mention made of an equivalent to America's Miranda rights. Another issue is the lack of jury trials in Japan, previous to 2009 all trials were decided by a judge or panel of judges. Currently, Japan uses a lay judge system in some criminal trials. For these reasons American authorities insist that service members be tried in military tribunals and reject article 98 of the Rome Statute of the International Criminal Court.

=== Political issues ===
The political issue of SOFAs is complicated by the fact that many host countries have mixed feelings about foreign bases on their soil, and demands to renegotiate the SOFA are often combined with calls for foreign troops to leave entirely. Issues of different national customs can arise – while the U.S. and host countries generally agree on what constitutes a crime, many U.S. observers feel that host country justice systems grant a much weaker set of protections to the accused than the U.S. and that the host country's courts can be subject to popular pressure to deliver a guilty verdict; furthermore, that American service members ordered to a foreign posting should not be forced to give up the rights they are afforded under the Bill of Rights. On the other hand, host country observers, having no local counterpart to the Bill of Rights, often feel that this is an irrelevant excuse for demanding special treatment, and resembles the extraterritorial agreements demanded by Western countries during colonialism. One host country where such sentiment is widespread, South Korea, itself has forces in Kyrgyzstan and has negotiated a SOFA that confers total immunity to its service members from prosecution by Kyrgyz authorities for any crime whatsoever, something far in excess of the privileges many South Koreans object to in their nation's SOFA with the United States.

== Visiting forces agreement ==
A visiting forces agreement is similar to a status of forces agreement except the former covers only forces temporarily in a country, not based there.

== See also ==
- U.S.–Iraq Status of Forces Agreement
- U.S.–Japan Status of Forces Agreement
- U.S.–South Korea Status of Forces Agreement
- Visiting Forces Act
- Visiting forces agreement
- Extraterritoriality
- Article 98 agreements
