= Cleveland Diesel Engine Division =

Research facility owned by General Motors

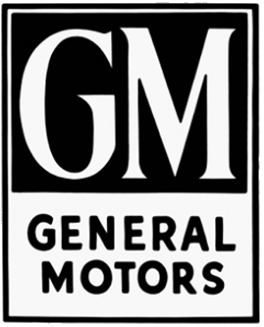
- Company type: Subsidiary of General Motors
- Industry: Marine Diesel Engines
- Predecessor: Winton Engine Corporation
- Founded: 1938
- Defunct: 1962
- Fate: Folded into Electro-Motive Division
- Headquarters: Cleveland, Ohio, United States
- Key people: Charles Kettering
- Products: Diesel engines
- Number of employees: 5,000 during World War II
- Parent: General Motors

The Cleveland Diesel Engine Division of General Motors (GM) was a leading research, design and production facility of diesel engines from the 1930s to the 1960s that was based in Cleveland, Ohio. The Cleveland Diesel Engine Division designed several 2 stroke diesel engines for submarines, tugboats, destroyer escorts, Patapsco-class gasoline tankers and other marine applications. Emergency generator sets were also built around the Cleveland Diesel and were installed in many US warships. The division was created in 1938 from the GM-owned Winton Engine Corporation and was folded into the GM Electro-Motive Division in 1962. The engines continue in use today on older tugs.

== History ==
Cleveland Diesel traces it roots to the Winton Gas Engine and Manufacturing Company, which was formed by the early Cleveland automobile manufacturer Alexander Winton in November 1912. Winton soon expanded into production of heavy spark-ignition and diesel engines, introducing the first American diesel in 1913. Renamed the Winton Engine Works in 1916, it manufactured marine and stationary diesel engines and spark-ignition engines for heavy vehicles. It was renamed again as the Winton Engine Company. During the 1920s, Winton became the main supplier of engines for self-propelled railcars. George W. Codrington replaced Winton as the president in 1928. General Motors purchased the company on June 20, 1930 and renamed it the Winton Engine Corporation on June 30, 1930. GM changed the name in 1938 to the Cleveland Diesel Engine Division of General Motors Corporation. Cleveland Diesel was dissolved by GM in 1962, with its remaining production moved under the GM Electro-Motive Division.

=== Winton Engine Corporation ===
Winton Engine Corporation embarked on a sustained research and development effort in partnership with the General Motors Research Division to develop diesel engines with improved power-to-weight ratios and output flexibility. That effort produced the first practical two-stroke diesel engines in the 400 to 1,200 hp (300 to 900 kW) range. The 2-stroke Winton Model 201A engines featured uniflow scavenging with intake ports in the cylinder walls and exhaust valves in the cylinder heads, and mechanical injection, which would carry over to later Cleveland Diesel designs. The 12 and 16 cylinder variants were 60 degree V type engines. They powered early Electro-Motive Corporation (another GM subsidiary) diesel locomotives and U.S. Navy submarines. In 1934 an 8-cylinder, 600-horsepower (447 kW), 8-201A diesel engine powered the first American diesel-powered train, the Burlington Zephyr streamliner passenger train. The research and development efforts in the mid-1930s branched into engines for locomotive (Model 567) and marine and stationary (Models 268 and 268A) use, produced under Winton's successor, the GM Cleveland Diesel Engine Division, and smaller diesel engines suited for road vehicles, introduced by GM's Detroit Diesel division in 1938.

Charles F. ("Boss") Kettering was the head of the GM Research Division in the 1930s. Boss Kettering oversaw the efforts that produced the Winton 201A, and the first engines produced under the Cleveland Diesel and Detroit Diesel names.

=== Cleveland Diesel Engine Division of General Motors ===
GM reorganized the Winton Engine Corporation in 1938 as the Cleveland Diesel Engine Division of General Motors. Locomotive engines were moved to the authority of GM's Electro-Motive Division in a January 1941 reorganization. The Cleveland Diesel Model 248 series resulted from a series of design changes to the Winton 201A engine. Further changes and increases in cylinder displacements resulted in the Model 278, and 278A during World War II. Cleveland diesel engines were used widely by the U.S. Navy in World War II, powering submarines, destroyer escorts, and numerous auxiliaries. They were also installed as generator sets and as auxiliary drives in many US warships built during the 1930s into the 1960s.

98% of Cleveland Diesel's business was government contracts by 1939. The plant was expanded in 1941, producing an estimated 70% of the diesel engines used in U.S. Navy's submarines during World War II. Employment rose to 5,000 during World War II but by 1947 dropped to 1,000. Production expanded again in the 1950s during the Cold War and Cleveland Diesel acquired the plants at 2160 W. 106th St. and 8200 Clinton Road in Cleveland, Ohio. The development and production of nuclear powered submarines in the U.S. Navy during the 1950s reduced the need for Cleveland Diesels and in 1962 General Motors closed the Cleveland plants, moving their remaining production to the Electro-Motive Division facility in LaGrange, Illinois.

== Cleveland Diesel Engines ==
Reliability issues with the Winton Model 201A led to its replacement with the improved Model 248 for marine use and Model 567 for locomotive use. The Model 16-201A diesels in early fleet submarines such as the Porpoise class were eventually replaced with the Cleveland diesel 12-278A during World War II.

The Model 248 was offered in 8, 12 and 16-cylinder V type layouts. The two-stroke, Uniflow-scavenged engines employ a gear driven Roots blower on the front of the engine which provided aspiration for the cylinders. It is a medium speed marine diesel designed to operate at 750 rpm.

The Cleveland Diesel Model 248 cylinder displacement was increased in the Model 248A and further redesign for production simplification resulted in the Model 278 with aluminum pistons. In early World War Two it was redesigned again for increased cylinder displacement and horsepower resulting in the Model 278A with steel pistons. The Model 278A engine was built in 6, 8, 12, and 16-cylinder variants. The Cleveland Diesel Division product line produced it through the late 1950s.

The Model 567 was a purpose-built locomotive engine introduced by Cleveland Diesel in 1938. It was a two stroke, uniflow scavenged, roots blown, unit injected engine with intake ports in the cylinder walls and exhaust valves in the cylinder head. It was produced in 6, 8, 12, and 16 cylinder variants. The 12 and 16 cylinder variants were in a 45 degree V configuration. In January 1941 production was moved under the authority of the GM Electro-Motive Division.

Cleveland Diesel Engine Division produced the following engines:

- 248 (8, 12, 16 Cylinder)
  - 3 of 6 Salmon-class submarines
    - 4 16-cylinder engines, 2 hydraulic drive, 2 electric
    - Snapper (SS-185), Stingray (SS-186), Sturgeon (SS-187)
  - 6 of 10 Sargo-class submarines
    - 4 16-cylinder engines
    - Sculpin (SS-191), Squalus (SS-192) (2 hydraulic, 2 electric)
    - Swordfish (SS-193), Sealion (SS-195), Searaven (SS-196), Seawolf (SS-197) (4 electric)
  - 7 Fulton-class submarine tenders
    - 8 16-248 engines diesel electric drive, 8 motors, 2 gearboxes, 2 shafts
  - a portion of 77 Gato-class submarines (4 16-cylinder engines)
  - a portion of 120 Balao-class submarines (4 16-cylinder engines)
- 258 (12 Cylinder – 4 stroke, direct reversing)
- 258S (16 Cylinder – 4 stroke, turbocharged, direct reversing)
  - 88 of 343 PC-461-class submarine chasers (2 x 1,440 bhp 16-cylinder engines, Farrel-Birmingham single reduction gear)
- 268 (3, 4, 6, 8 Cylinder)
- 268A (3, 4, 6, 8 Cylinder)
  - 195 of 438 SC-497-class submarine chasers (2 × 8-268A)
  - 481 YMS-1-class minesweepers (2 × 8-268A 440shp driving 2 shafts)
  - 97 Evarts-class destroyer escorts (including 32 Captain-class frigates)
    - 2 × 8-268A (350HP) electrical systems
    - 2 × 3-268A (150HP) electrical backup and while docked
  - 72 Cannon-class destroyer escorts
    - 2 × 8-268A (350HP) electrical systems
    - 2 × 3-268A (150HP) electrical backup and while docked
  - MS Chinook (automobile ferry, 1947)
    - 2 8-cyl. driving 2 200kw Westinghouse auxiliary generators
- 268A NM (8 Cylinder)
- 278 (6, 8, 12, 16 Cylinder)
  - 24 of 95 Auk-class minesweepers (2 x 1,766shp 12-cylinder electric drive. single reduction gear, 2 shafts)
  - 10 of 29 Cherokee-class tugboats
    - 4 × 12-278 diesel-electric, 1 × Fairbanks Morse reduction gears, 1 shaft 3,000shp
- 278A (6, 8, 12, 16 Cylinder)
  - 97 Evarts-class destroyer escorts (diesel-electric) (4 16-cylinder engines main propulsion)
  - 72 Cannon-class destroyer escorts (diesel-electric) (4 16-cylinder engines main propulsion)
  - 57 of 343 PC-461-class submarine chasers (2 x 1,440 bhp 16-cylinder engines, Farrel-Birmingham single reduction gear)
  - N of 68 PCE-842-class patrol craft (Falk single reduction gearing) (2 12-cylinder engines, 2 shafts)
    - Crestview (PCE-895) ... Gettysburg (PCE-904)
    - PCE-881 (replacing 567A engines), PCE-882
    - PCE-855 ... PCE-858
    - PCE-860
    - PCE-886
  - a portion of 77 Gato-class submarines (4 16-cylinder engines)
  - a portion of 120 Balao-class submarines (4 16-cylinder engines)
  - 1 of 29 Tench-class submarines (4 16-cylinder engines)
    - the only one built (and finished) by Electric Boat
    - Corsair (SS-435)
  - 20 of 95 Auk-class minesweepers (2 x 1,766shp 12-cylinder electric drive. single reduction gear, 2 shafts)
  - 49 Sotoyomo-class tugboats
    - 2 × 12-278A diesel-electric engines, 1 × Fairbanks-Morse reduction gears, 1 × shaft, 1,200shp
  - 16 of 29 Cherokee-class tugboats
    - 4 × 12-278A diesel-electric, 0 or 1 × Fairbanks Morse reduction gears, 1 shaft, 3,000shp or 3,600shp
  - 23 Patapsco-class gasoline tankers
    - 4 × 12-278A diesel-electric, 2 shafts, 3,300 hp
  - 69 of 1052 Landing Ship Tank (2 12-cylinder engines, 2 shafts, 1,700shp)
    - 932 ... 979, 1060 ... 1080
  - MS Chinook (automobile ferry, 1947)
    - 4 16-cyl. diesels driving 4 DC generators, 2 motors, 2 shafts, 4,800shp total
- 278A NM (8, 12 Cylinder)
- 241 (6 cylinder – 4 stroke)
- 288 (12 Cylinder – direct reversing)
  - 2 of 35 Barnegat-class seaplane tenders (2 shafts, 6,080shp)
    - Barnegat (AVP-10), Biscayne (AVP-11)
    - the rest used Fairbanks Morse 38 8-1/8 diesel engines
- 338 (16 Cylinder – vertical radial)
- 498 (8, 12, 16 Cylinder)
- 498 NM (8 Cylinder)
- 358H (16 Cylinder – Horizontal radial)
- 567 (6, 8, 12, 16 Cylinder two-stroke locomotive engine, 1938–1940)
  - 3 of 29 Cherokee-class tugboats
    - 4 × 12-567 diesel electric, 1 × Fairbanks Morse reduction gears, 1 shaft, 3,000shp
- 567A
  - 49 of 68 PCE-842-class patrol craft
    - 2 12-cylinder engines, Falk single reduction gear, 2 shafts
    - PCE-827 ... PC-854, PCE-859, PCE-867 ... PCE-877
    - PCE-879 ... PCE-881, PCE-883 ... PCE-885, PCE-891 ... PCE-894
  - 983 of 1052 Landing Ship Tank Mk.2 (2 12-cylinder engines, 2 shafts, 1,700shp)
    - 1 ... 931 minus 100 cancelled in that range, 980 ... 1059, 1081 ... 1152

== Cleveland diesel-powered fleet submarines ==
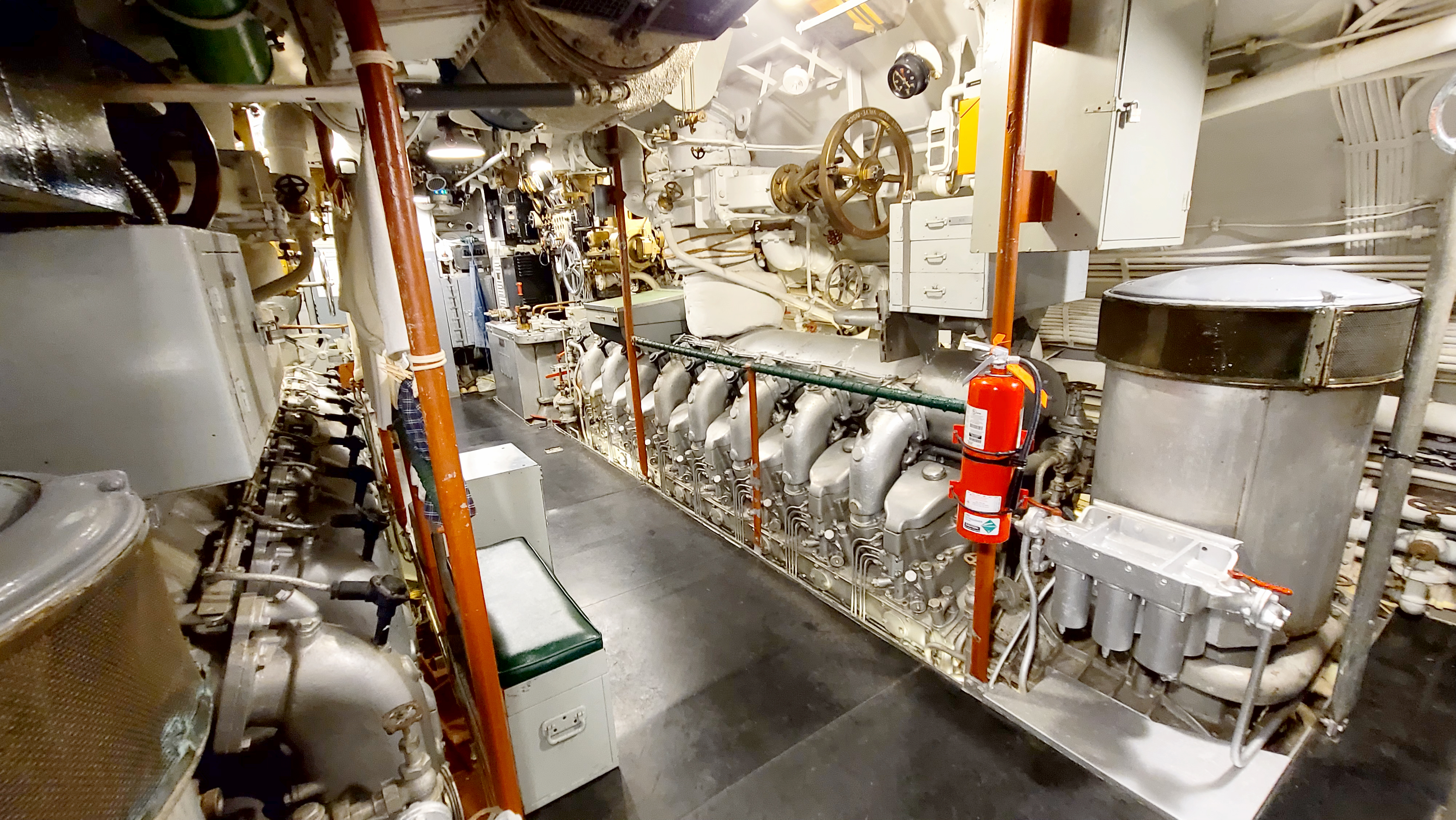
General Motors Cleveland Model 16-248 diesel engine

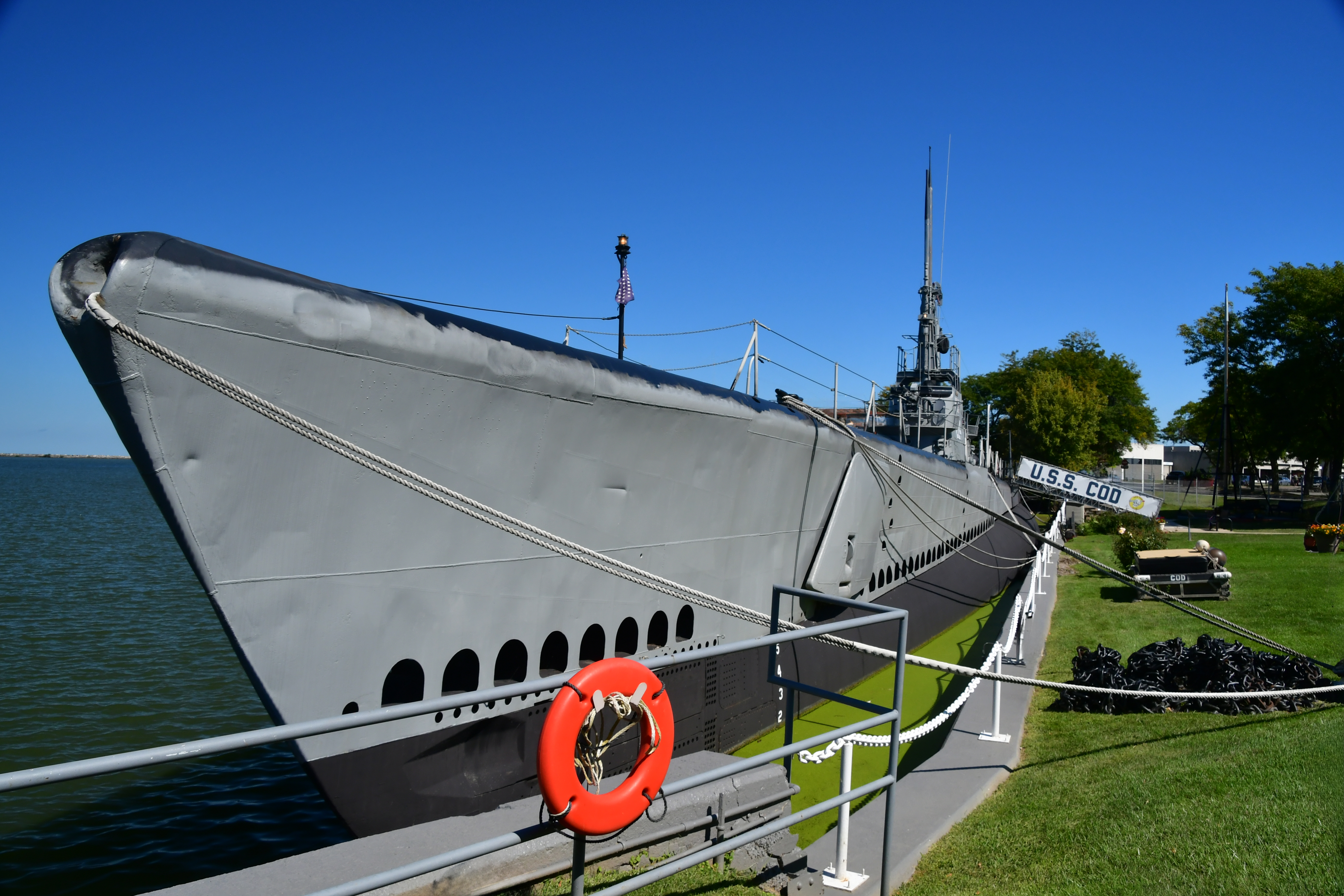
USS Cod one of the World War II submarines with General Motors Cleveland diesel engines

The Cleveland Diesel Engine Division of General Motors built the majority of submarine engines during World War II. The Model 16-248 and 16-278A were installed in many of the Salmon, Sargo, Tambor, Gato, and Balao classes of diesel electric submarines built in World War II and they continued to operate in U.S. service until the 1980s and in foreign service until the 2000s. Two models of the Cleveland diesels were used as main engines in World War II era fleet type submarines, the Model 16-248 and Model 16-278A. The 16-248 was installed in Cleveland diesel equipped submarines until the Model 16-278 was introduced. Cleveland diesel installations since early World War II were Model 16-278A engines.

They are of a 16-cylinder V-type engine with two banks of eight cylinders each. The engines operates on the 2-stroke cycle principle, are air started, and are rated at 1600 bhp at 756 rpm on the 16-248 and 750 rpm on the 16-278A. The size of the bore and stroke of the 16-248 engine is 8 1/2 inches and 10 1/2 inches respectively as compared to 8 3/4 inches and 10 1/2 inches for Model 16-278A. Both models were connected to electric generators which charged the main batteries and/or powered the main propulsion motors which drove the ship's propellers via reduction gears (Elliott Company, General Electric, or Allis-Chalmers)

The Cleveland Diesel Model 268 inline diesel was used as an auxiliary engine in many fleet submarines and as emergency backup generators on larger warships. They also found use in commercial applications. The 8-cylinder, in-line, 2-cycle, air starting engine, rated at 300KW generator output at 1200 rpm. The size of the bore and stroke is 6 3/8 inches and 7 inches respectively. The small displacement Barracuda class used three 8-268A Cleveland diesels which developed 1050 shp.

== See also ==
- Diesel Engine
- Fairbanks-Morse
- Hooven-Owens-Rentschler
- Electro-Motive Diesel
