= Malvar (disambiguation) =

Malvar is a municipality in the province of Batangas, Philippines.

Malvar may also refer to:

- Malvar (grape), a Spanish wine grape
- Malvar (surname)
- Malvar: Tuloy ang Laban, an unfinished war film
- Malvar station, a proposed station on the Manila light rail
- Malvar Enerzone Corporation
- BRP Miguel Malvar, ships of the Philippine Navy
- Malvar-class corvette
- Miguel Malvar-class frigate
