= BRP Cebu =

Decommissioned Philippine Navy Miguel Malvar-class corvette

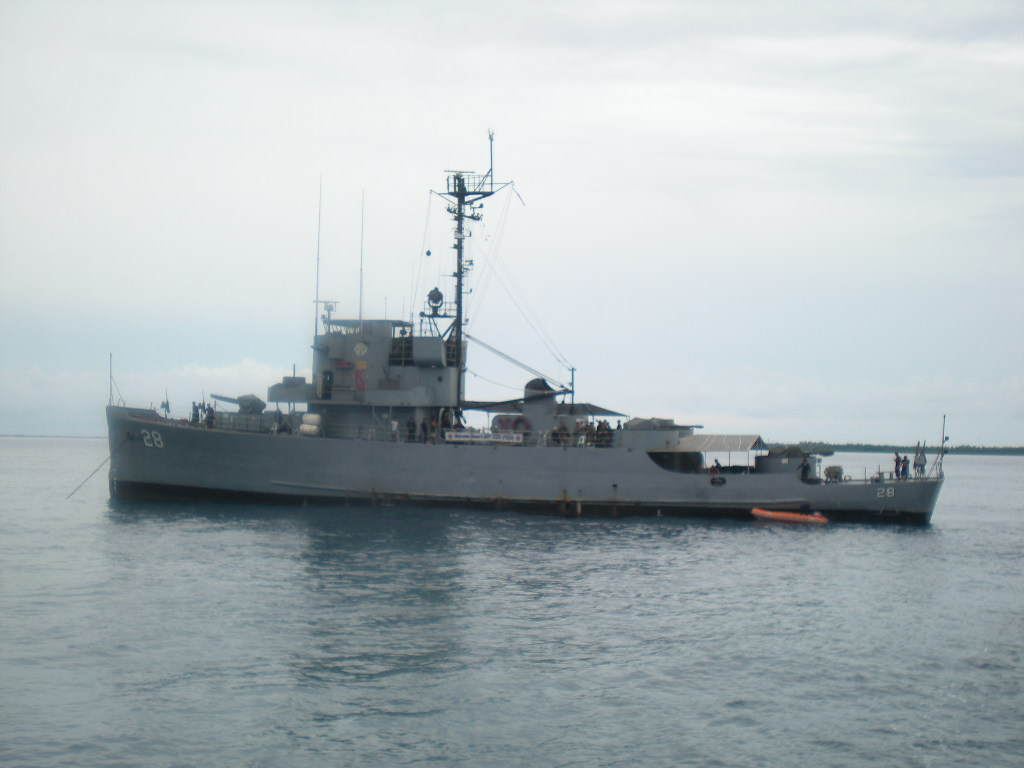
- BRP Cebu (PS-28)

History

United States
- Name: PCE-881
- Builder: Albina Engine and Machine Works, Portland, Oregon
- Laid down: 21 August 1943
- Launched: 10 November 1943
- Commissioned: 31 July 1944
- Fate: transferred to the Philippine Navy, July 1948

History

Philippines
- Name: Cebu
- Namesake: Cebu
- Acquired: 2 July 1948
- Commissioned: 2 July 1948
- Decommissioned: 1 October 2019
- Renamed: RPS Cebu (PS-28) 1965; BRP Cebu (PS-28) June 1980
- Fate: Seen capsized on 30 October 2022 after Severe Tropical Storm Nalgae

General characteristics
- Class & type: PCE-842-class patrol craft (in U.S. Navy service); Miguel Malvar-class corvette (in Philippine Navy service)
- Type: Patrol Corvette (1948-1992/1993); Gun Corvette (1992/1993-2019)
- Displacement: 914 tons (full load)
- Length: 184.5 ft (56.2 m)
- Beam: 33 ft (10 m)
- Draft: 9.4 ft (2.9 m)
- Installed power: 2 × GM6-71 diesel engines with 100KW gen; 1 × GM3-268A diesel engine with 60KW gen
- Propulsion: 2 × GM12-278A diesel engines with a combined 2,200 hp (1,600 kW); (previous) 2 × GM12-567ATL diesel engines; (original) 2 × Cooper Bessemer GSB-8 diesel engines
- Speed: from last engine replacement: 1.6MW power; 16 knots max; 14 knots sustained; 12 knots economy; from original engines or 1st replacement or both 15.7 knots (29.1 km/h; 18.1 mph) max
- Range: 6,600 nmi (12,200 km; 7,600 mi) at 11 knots (20 km/h; 13 mph)
- Complement: 85
- Sensors & processing systems: Raytheon AN/SPS-64(V)11 navigation & surface search radar system; SATCOM, GPS; Removed Sensors (during the 1992-1993 overhaul & refit); Sonar system; SPS-21D surface search radar; RCA SPN-18 navigation radar
- Armament: Config til her retirement; SuW-AAW; 1 × 76mm L/50 (3 inch 50 calibres Long) dual-purpose cannon on a Mk.26 mount; 3 × Bofors 40mm L/60 single-barrel AA rapid-fire cannons; 4 × Mk.10 Oerlikon 20 mm AA rapid-fire cannons; 4 × M2 Browning 50caliber (12.7mm) heavy machine guns; 30cal medium machine guns; Removed Armaments (either during the 1992-1993 overhaul & refit ) or during 1980's): ASW; 1 × Hedgehog antisubmarine mortar projector; 4 × K-gun depth charge projectors; 2 × depth charge racks; SuW-AAW; 3 × twin-barrel Mk.1 Bofors 40mm AA cannons

BRP Cebu (PS-28) was a Miguel Malvar-class corvette of the Philippine Navy. She was originally built as USS PCE-881, a PCE-842-class patrol craft for the United States Navy during World War II and patrolled the Alaskan coast during that war. She was decommissioned from the U.S. Navy and transferred to the Philippine Navy in July 1948 and renamed RPS Cebu (E-28) after the Philippine province of the same name. The ship was decommissioned on 1 October 2019. Along with other World War II-era ships of the Philippine Navy, Cebu was considered one of the world's oldest fighting ships during her active service.

== History ==
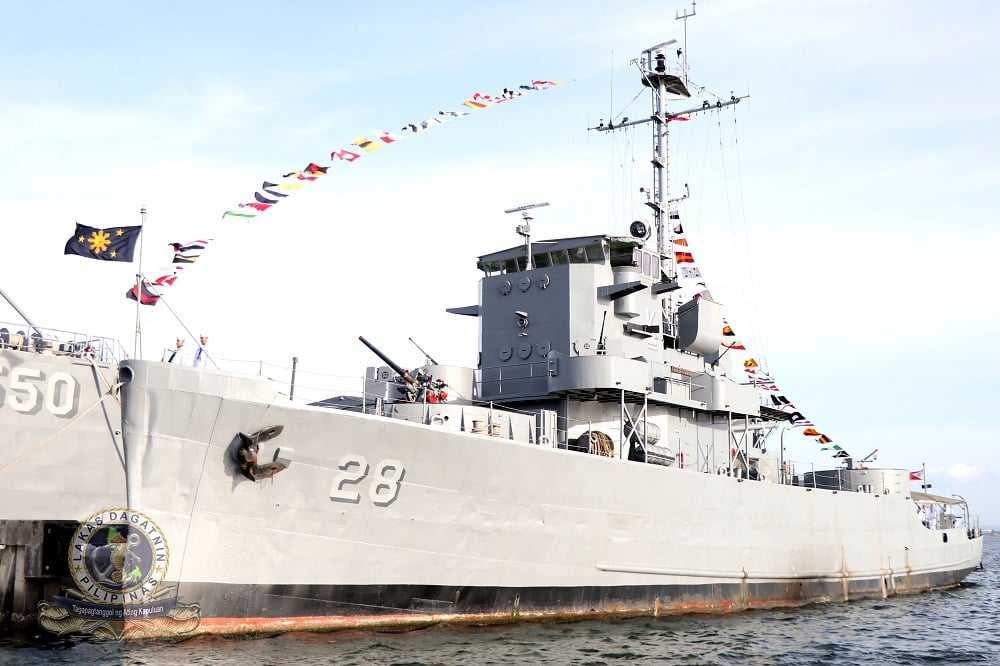
BRP Cebu during its decommissioning ceremony

Commissioned in the US Navy as USS PCE-881 in 1944, and patrolled the coast of Alaska during World War II. The ship was decommissioned after World War II.

She was then transferred and commissioned into the Philippine Naval Patrol and was renamed RPS Cebu (E-28) in July 1948. She was carried on to the Philippine Navy in 1951, and in the 1960s she was renamed as RPS Cebu (PS-28) using a new ship naming and classification system. Again in June 1980 she was renamed BRP Cebu (PS-28) using a new localized prefix.

In 1992 the ship underwent major overhaul, weapons and radar systems refit, and upgrade of communications gear.

BRP Cebu won the Philippine Navy "Ship of the Year" award for the year 2009.

She was assigned with the Patrol Force of the Philippine Fleet, under the jurisdiction of Naval Forces Western Mindanao.

She was decommissioned in a ceremony on 1 October 2019.

In October 2022, the ship along with the BRP Rajah Humabon (PS-11) and BRP Sultan Kudarat (PS-22) was seen tilted over and submerged at the Naval Station Pascual Ledesma in Cavite after the onslaught of Severe Tropical Storm Nalgae (Paeng).

== Notable operations ==
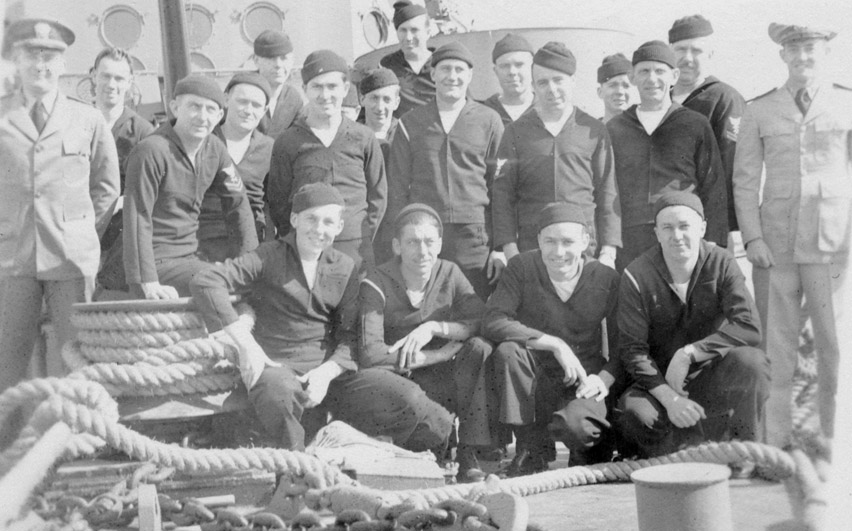
Part of the crew of USS PCE 881, which patrolled the coast of Alaska during World War II.

After the ship's construction and the crew's training was completed in Portland Oregon, it patrolled the coast of Alaska from the Aleutian Islands to the Bering Strait during World War II. The ship's commanding officer was Lieutenant Commander W.W. Adams.

Between 19 and 22 March 1958, then RPS Cebu participated in the first bilateral exercise between the Philippine and US Navies dubbed Exercise "Bulwark One". It took part on the 3rd phase of the exercise off the waters of Corregidor and Caballo Islands.

On 1968, during the height of the so-called 'Operation Merdeka', against the combined might of the Royal Navy and Royal Malaysian Navy ships, BRP Cebu stood her 'ground' to protect the maritime border of the Philippines and confronted the British-Malaysian warships raring to do a battle with her after learning that the Philippines is preparing to invade Sabah. The stand-off between the Philippine Navy and British-Malaysian Navy lasted for 10 tense hours giving the Philippine Navy patrol craft escort/corvette a victory for not yielding even an inch of the Philippine territory.

As of 23 June 2008, she and her onboard medical team participated in the search and rescue of the MV Princess of the Stars of Sulpicio Lines, which capsized off the coast of San Fernando, Romblon at the height of Typhoon Fengshen on 22 June 2008.

BRP Cebu and BRP Pangasinan (PS-31) have alternately secured the Southern Sulu Sea where the Baduria Well is located. She also provides security for the West Aquarius Oil Rig.

In middle of May 2018, the BRP Cebu participated in the Third Combined Maritime Security Activity with the Royal Australian Navy (RAN) along with the BRP General Mariano Alvarez (PS-38), BRP Anastacio Cacayorin (PS-381), BRP Dioscoro Papa (PG-381) and BRP Filipino Flojo (PG-386). The RAN sent the vessels HMAS Albany (ACPB 86) and HMAS Glenelg (ACPB 96) for the exercise.

In the latter part of May 2018, the BRP Cebu held a meeting with the Royal Malaysian Navy (RMN) ship, the KD Sri Tiga at the maritime border between Malaysia and the Philippines to exchange intelligence information as part of the Trilateral Maritime Patrol Programme in the Eastern Security Zone (Esszone) of Sabah.

== Technical details ==
There are slight differences between the BRP Cebu as compared to some of her sister ships in the Philippine Navy, since her previous configuration was as an Escort-type ASW Patrol Craft (PCE, i.e., equipment more on being a combatant), while the others are configured as Rescue-oriented ASW Escort Patrol Craft (PCER, i.e., having more equipment to tend the wounded & such, like a small hospital ship), and as minesweepers (Admirable class) ships.

=== Armaments ===
Originally, the ship was armed with:
SuW-AAW

- 1 × Mk.26 76mm (3-inch) 50L DP (dual-purpose) cannon
- 3 × (twin-barrel) Mk.1 Bofors 40mm AA cannons
- 4 × Mk.10 Oerlikon 20 mm AA cannons (or in 1 × quad-barrel config)

ASW

- 1 × Hedgehog antisubmarine mortar projector
- 4 × K-gun depth charge projectors
- 2 × depth charge racks

This configuration applies before its overhaul in the early 1990s. That config is what made her as a patrol corvette - an ASW vessel lower than a corvette.

During its overhaul and refit in 1992, the Philippine Navy removed her old anti-submarine weapons and systems, and made some changes in the armament set-up. Some sources claim the loss of its three Bofors 40mm cannons during the 1992-1993 overhaul and refit period, but photos on 2009 show the Bofors guns still present, although in singles instead of twins. Thus, armaments fitout to the ship are:

- 1 × Mk.26 76mm (3") 50L DP cannon (fore)
- 3 × (single-barrel)Bofors 40mm close-in anti-air rapid-firing lite cannons (aft)
- 4 × Mk.10 Oerlikon 20 mm close-in anti-air rapid-firing lite cannons (2 each on bridge wings) or only 3 cannons on this same source
- 4 × M2 Browning 50cal (12.7mm) heavy machine guns (2 beside main bridge, 2 aft near the ship's end) [added during that refit]

This configuration makes the ship lighter and better suited for surface patrols, but at the cost of her already limited anti-submarine warfare capability. She is essentially a gun-type corvette - a tougher, more heavily armed OPV than the usual coast guard patrol vessels and similar ships.

=== Electronics ===
Also during the refit the ship's SPS-21D surface search radar and RCA SPN-18 navigation radar was replaced by a Raytheon AN/SPS-64(V)11 surface search and navigation radar system. Later modifications included the installation of long range and satellite communications systems, and GPS system standard to all Philippine Navy ships.

=== Machinery ===
The ship is powered by two GM 12-278A diesel engines, with a combined rating of around 2,200 bhp (1,600 kW) driving two propellers. The main engines can propel the 914 tons (full load) ship to a maximum speed of around 16 knots (30 km/h).

== In popular culture ==
- BRP Cebu was the ship escorting a fictional Philippine Navy Whidbey Island-class LSD BRP Cagayan de Oro during a mission to reclaim the Mischief Reef from the Chinese in the 1997 novel Dragon Strike - The Millennium War by Humphrey Hawksley and Simon Holberton. In the said novel, the mission failed as Chinese Su-27s sank the Cagayan de Oro, and Chinese forces repulsed the attacks of the Philippine Marines to retake the reef. This resulted to the total withdrawal of the Philippines from the South China Sea war against China.
