= DragonStrike =

DragonStrike or Dragon Strike may refer to:

- DragonStrike (video game), a computer game in which the player flew a dragon
- DragonStrike (board game), a board game intended to serve as an introduction to Dungeons & Dragons
- Dragon Strike (novel), a novel by Humphrey Hawksley
- Dragon Lord or Dragon Strike, a Jackie Chan film
- Dragon Strike, an Age of Fire novel by E. E. Knight
