= Sultan Kudarat (disambiguation) =

Sultan Kudarat may refer to:

- Muhammad Kudarat (1581–1671), a 17th-century sultan of Maguindanao
  - Sultan Kudarat, a province in the Philippines named in his honor
  - Sultan Kudarat, Maguindanao del Norte, a municipality also named after him
- BRP Sultan Kudarat, a corvette of the Philippine Navy
