= BRP Miguel Malvar =

BRP Malvar is the name of the following ships of the Philippine Navy named for General Miguel Malvar:

- BRP Miguel Malvar (PS-19), lead Malvar-class corvette, acquired 1976, in commission 1977–2021
- BRP Miguel Malvar (FFG-6), lead Miguel Malvar-class frigate, commissioned in 2025
