= BRP Datu Marikudo =

Corvette of the Philippine Navy

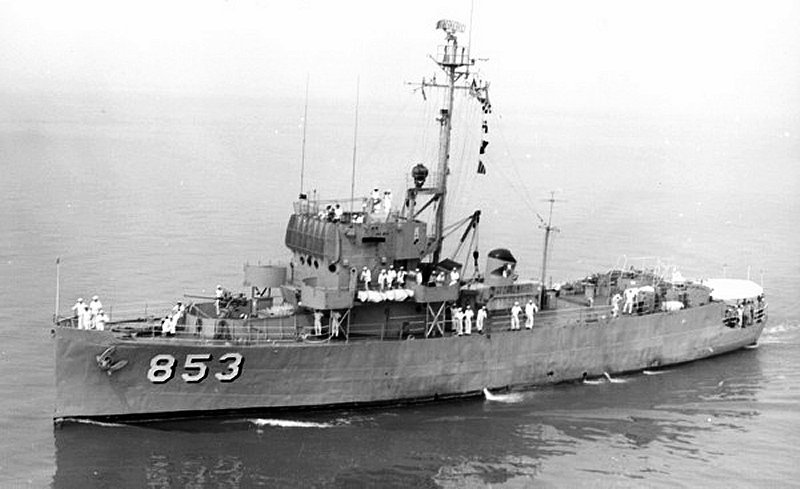
- As USS Amherst (PCER-853)

History

United States
- Name: PCE(R)-853
- Builder: Pullman-Standard Car Manufacturing Co., Chicago, Illinois
- Laid down: 16 November 1943
- Launched: 18 March 1944
- Commissioned: 15 June 1944
- Renamed: USS Amherst (PCE(R)-853), 15 February 1956
- Decommissioned: 6 February 1970
- Fate: transferred to Republic of Vietnam Navy, 1970

History

South Vietnam
- Name: RVNS Vạn Kiếp II (HQ-14)
- Acquired: 1970
- Fate: Escaped to the Philippines after fall of South Vietnam, 1975

History

Philippines
- Name: Datu Marikudo
- Namesake: Datu Marikudo
- Commissioned: 5 April 1976
- Decommissioned: 9 December 2010
- Renamed: BRP Datu Marikudo (PS-23), July 1980

General characteristics
- Class & type: PCE(R)-848-class patrol craft (in U.S. Navy service)
- Class & type: Miguel Malvar-class corvette (in Philippine Navy service)
- Displacement: 914 tons (full load)
- Length: 184.5 ft (56.2 m)
- Beam: 33 ft (10 m)
- Draft: 9.75 ft (2.97 m)
- Propulsion: Main: 2 × GM 12-278A diesel engines; Auxiliary: 2 × GM 6-71 diesel engines with 100 kW gen and 1 × GM 3-268A diesel engine with 60 kW gen
- Speed: 16 knots (30 km/h; 18 mph) (maximum),
- Range: 6,600 nmi (12,200 km; 7,600 mi) at 11 knots (20 km/h; 13 mph)
- Complement: 85
- Sensors & processing systems: SPS-50 surface search radar; RCA SPN-18 I/J-band navigation radar
- Armament: 1 × 3-inch/50-caliber gun (76 mm) Mk22 dual-purpose gun; 3 × single Bofors 40 mm gun; 4 × Oerlikon 20 mm cannon Mk10 guns; 4 × .50 cal (12.7 mm) machine guns

BRP Datu Marikudo (PS-23) was a Malvar-class corvette of the Philippine Navy. She was originally built as USS PCE(R)-853, a PCE(R)-848-class patrol craft for the United States Navy during World War II. She was renamed USS Amherst (PCE(R)-853) on 15 February 1956, namesake of both Amherst, Massachusetts and Amherst, Ohio. In February 1970, Amherst was decommissioned and transferred to South Vietnam for service in the Republic of Vietnam Navy as RVNS Vạn Kiếp II (HQ-14). She remained in South Vietnamese service until the collapse of that country in 1975. Vạn Kiếp II was one of several ships that fled from South Vietnam to the Philippines. She was then commissioned into the Philippine Navy on 5 April 1976 and named in honor of Datu Marikudo. Along with other World War II-era ships of the Philippine Navy, Datu Marikudo was considered one of the oldest active fighting ships in the world until her decommissioning.

== History ==
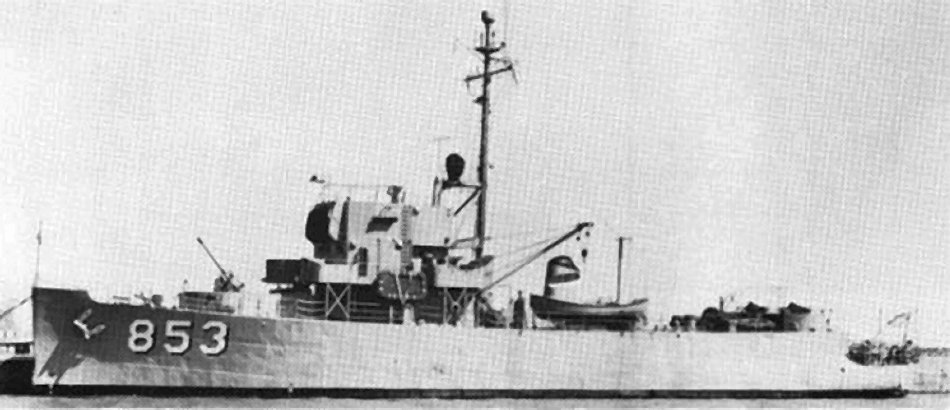
as USS PCER-853

Commissioned in the US Navy as the USS PCER-853 in 1944, she was assigned in the Pacific theatre of operations, first in support of landing operations in Leyte and Lingayen in the Philippine Islands. She was also assigned to convoy escort duties, rescue operations, and other combat support duties in Okinawa area.

PCER-853 entered the Navy yard in Hawaii and was still undergoing overhaul when Japan capitulated. In September 1945, the vessel steamed to the east coast of the United States and was placed in the Atlantic Reserve Fleet at Green Cove Springs, Fla.

In December 1947, PCER-853 served as a training vessel for Naval Reserve personnel in the 4th Naval District. The ship was placed back in active status on 28 November 1950 and carried out training duty at Philadelphia for the next 10 years. On 15 February 1956, the ship was renamed the Amherst (PCE(R)-853). On 6 February 1970, Amherst was placed in an "out of service, special" status for pre-transfer overhaul. Her name was struck from the Navy list on 3 June 1970.

She was then transferred to the Republic of Vietnam in 1970. She served the Republic of Vietnam Navy as Vạn Kiếp II (HQ-14) up until her escape to the Philippines in 1975, together with other South Vietnamese Navy ships and their respective crew.

She was commissioned into the Philippine Navy and was renamed RPS Datu Marikudo (PS-23), and was renamed in 1980 as the BRP Datu Marikudo (PS-23). Her last assignment was with the Patrol Force of the Philippine Fleet, She was programmed to have major repair as of 2007, but on 9 December 2010 she was decommissioned after she was found to be beyond economical repair and will be sold as scrap. Her equipment was stripped as spare for her operational sisterships.

== Technical details ==
Originally the ship was armed with one 3"/50-caliber dual-purpose gun, two single Bofors 40 mm guns, six Oerlikon 20 mm cannon guns, 1 Hedgehog depth charge projector, four depth charge projectiles (K-guns) and two depth charge racks.

The same configuration applies up until the late 1980s when the Philippine Navy removed most of her old anti-submarine weapons and systems, and instead mounted one 40 mm gun mount, four 20 mm Oerlikon Mk10 guns, and four 12.7 mm general-purpose machine guns. This made her lighter and ideal for surface patrols, but losing her limited but dated anti-submarine warfare capability.

The ship is powered by two GM 12-278A diesel engines similar to her sister ships, with a combined rating of around 2,200 bhp (1,600 kW) driving two propellers. The main engines can propel the 914 tons (full load) ship to a maximum speed of around 16 knots (30 km/h).

There are slight difference between the BRP Datu Marikudo as compared to some of her sister ships in the Philippine Navy, since her previous configuration was as a patrol craft escort, while there are others who were originally configured as minesweepers.
