= The Third World War (novel) =

2003 book by Humphrey Hawksley

- Author: Humphrey Hawksley
- Language: English
- Genre: Apocalysm
- Publisher: Pan Books
- Publication date: 2003
- Publication place: United Kingdom
- Media type: Print (Paperback)
- Pages: 514 pp (first edition, paperback)
- ISBN: 0-330-49249-7 (first edition, paperback)
- OCLC: 54784780
- Preceded by: Red Spirit
- Followed by: The History Book

The Third World War is an apocalyptic novel, published in 2003 by the British journalist and author Humphrey Hawksley, portraying the modern world as it deals with the ever-worsening geopolitical situation.

The book follows various world leaders from across the globe, as they try to act in their national and personal interests. Focusing mainly on the Indian, Pakistani, North Korean, American, Russian and Chinese leaderships, it also focuses on various military and civilian characters.

== Plot ==
=== The Early Triggers ===
India's Parliament is mostly destroyed in an apparent terrorist attack while in session waiting for an address by the Prime Minister. The casualties are significant, and the suspicion immediately turns to Pakistani-based terrorists. Unknown individuals initiate a massacre of Hindu citizens, triggering a Hindu back lash and triggering riots across India. The president of Pakistan, who is on a visit to Malaysia, is assassinated by a member of his security detail. An Islamic uprising quickly gains control of the Philippines and Brunei. Coups take place in Pakistan, under a fundamental military regime, and in North Korea, where a former military commander and party strongman takes over from the current ruling disposition. At the same time there is a theft of a new super virus from an Australian laboratory and a weaponized smallpox virus from Russia.

=== Escalation ===
The new regime in North Korea launches an unarmed missile targeting an American base in Japan, killing many US troops and bringing United States into the crisis. At the same time, the United Kingdom intervenes and liberates Brunei from the takeover by the Islamists. The new military regimes in Pakistan and North Korea, with China looking the other way, collaborates and Pakistan transfers a few nuclear weapons to North Korea in return for a long-range missile which can reach anywhere in India and beyond. This is immediately followed by a mortar attack on the Indian Prime Minister's house, which fails to kill him. An outraged India asks the United Nations, especially the US and China, to neutralize Pakistan. Upon failing in this, India threatens war with Pakistan. The new North Korean regime prepares for an invasion of South Korea while also testing a new biological weapon created from the viruses stolen from Australia and Russia. Russia and China express their desire to stay out of the conflict, while at the same time China warns the United States that North Korea and Pakistan which they consider allies, are not to be interfered with. Japan, now headed by a nationalist leader and not happy with the US response to the missile attack on Japan, threatens to withdraw from the mutual defense treaty with the US and develop nuclear weapons for itself. Threatened with an invasion from the North, the South Koreans also toy with the idea of acquiring nuclear weapons. An Islamic cleric with his own agenda also conspires with North Korea and Pakistan to precipitate this crisis.

=== Countdown to Armageddon ===
In face of the rapidly escalating crisis of seemingly unconnected events, confusion and indecision reign supreme in the situation room of the US administration and in talks between the various major powers with no co-ordinated actions taken against the escalating threats. The connections between the various characters also become evident. The North Koreans successfully weaponize the new virus obtained from Australia and, as a demonstration of their capability, launch a missile to the middle of the Pacific Ocean where the US detects the presence of the biological agent. Japan conducts an underground nuclear test and officially becomes a nuclear power. In the seemingly monolithic Chinese leadership, cracks become visible as differences surface between the pacifist president and the more militaristic party leadership and the Military Commission. The United States also discovers the presence of Chinese nuclear missiles in Cuba.

==== Descent into the Abyss ====
For reasons not very clearly defined, the Pakistani military leadership decides on a pre-emptive nuclear strike against India. The choice of delivery is a fighter bomber whose pilot drops the bomb on the Pakistani nuclear complex instead. Pakistan launches a nuclear attack against India, which destroys New Delhi. India threatens nuclear retaliation against Pakistan, and to prevent a regional nuclear exchange, Russia and China invade Pakistan to try to neutralize the rest of the country's nuclear weapons. The invasion is unsuccessful as Pakistan launches 6 nuclear missiles, and India retaliates with a massive nuclear strike, which completely destroys Pakistan. The United Kingdom, in collaboration with the US ,strikes North Korea with the intention of destroying all of the underground bunkers, but fails to neutralize the North Korean leadership. New York is hit by a suicide bomber who has infected himself with the new engineered virus and, prior to detonating himself, spreads the virus from aerosol containers. The first report of infected people starts to appear within 24 hrs of the attack.

=== Mutually Assured Destruction ===
Once the initial shots have been fired, the crisis quickly spins out of control with retaliatory nuclear strikes by North Korea and Japan, an unsuccessful intercept of nuclear missiles launched at the US, a power shift in China, and both China and Russia entering the war, resulting in a worldwide Armageddon. In the Epilogue it is suggested that all the formal governments in the countries have been destroyed, with the leadership hunkered in underground bunkers with the world still officially at war.
