= Malvar (surname) =

Malvar is a surname. Notable people with the surname include:

- Fernando Malvar-Ruiz (born 1968), Equatorial Guinean musician
- Julia Becerra Malvar (1892–1974), Spanish politician
- Marciano Malvar Guzman (died 2009), Filipino philosopher
- Marie Malvar (1983–2003), murder victim of Gary Ridgway
- Miguel Malvar (1865–1911), Filipino general
- Rico Malvar (born 1953), Brazilian engineer and signal processing researcher
- Therese Malvar (born 2000), Filipina actress
