= BRP Magat Salamat =

Miguel Malvar-class corvette of the Philippine Navy

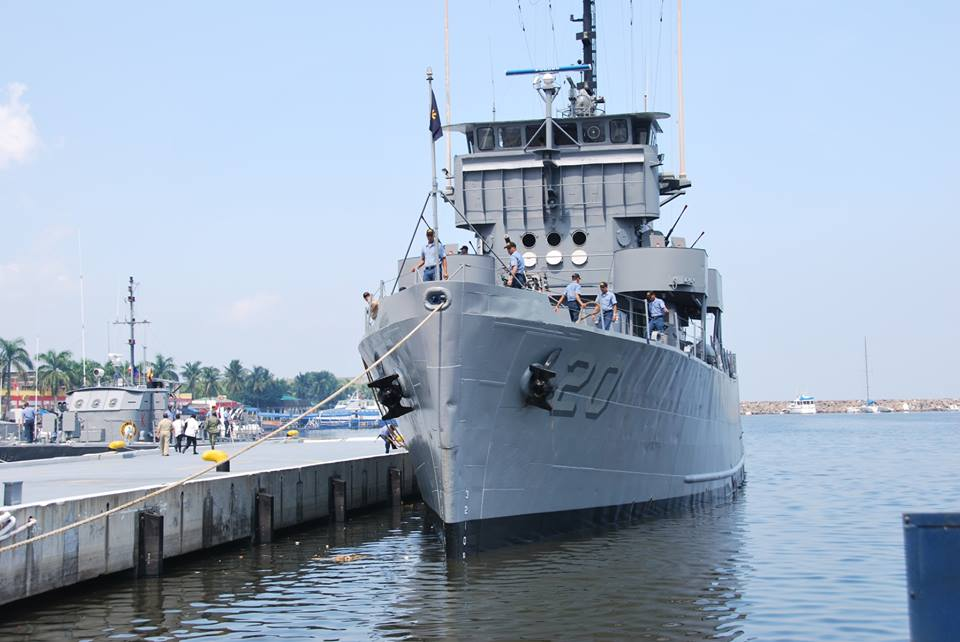
- BRP Magat Salamat (PS-20)

History

United States
- Name: Gayety (AM-239)
- Ordered: 1942
- Builder: Winslow Marine Railway and Shipbuilding
- Laid down: 14 November 1943
- Launched: 19 March 1944
- Commissioned: 23 September 1944
- Decommissioned: 1 March 1954
- Reclassified: Fleet Minesweeper, MSF-239
- Fate: Transferred to Republic of Vietnam Navy on 17 April 1962.

South Vietnam
- Name: Chi Lăng II (HQ-08)
- Acquired: 17 April 1962
- Out of service: 1975
- Fate: Escaped to the Philippines in 1975

Philippines
- Name: Magat Salamat
- Namesake: Magat Salamat
- Acquired: 5 April 1976
- Commissioned: 7 February 1977
- Decommissioned: 10 December 2021
- Reclassified: Patrol Corvette
- Fate: Sunk as target in the Balikatan 2026 SINKEX (Sinking Exercise), 8 May 2026

General characteristics
- Class & type: Miguel Malvar-class corvette (in Philippine Navy service)
- Type: Gun Corvette (in PhN service, & likely in RVNN as well); Patrol Corvette (if ASW gears had remained when she escaped to PH in 1975, or to her earlier transfer to RVNN in 1962); Minesweeper (original config by USN)
- Displacement: 945 tons (full load)
- Length: 184.5 ft (56.2 m)
- Beam: 33 ft (10 m)
- Draft: 9.75 ft (2.97 m)
- Installed power: 2 × GM6-71 diesel engines with 100KW gen; 1 × GM3-268A diesel engine with 60KW gen
- Propulsion: 2 × GM12-278A diesel engines with a combined 2,200 hp (1,600 kW)
- Speed: max 16 knots (30 km/h; 18 mph) likely due to removal of ASW gears + minesweeping gears; sustained max 14 knots (26 km/h; 16 mph) likely reason same as max stated above; economy 12 knots (22 km/h; 14 mph) likely reason same as max stated above; max 14.8 knots (27.4 km/h; 17.0 mph) default spec
- Range: 5,370 nmi; 6,600 nmi (12,200 km; 7,600 mi) at 11 knots (20 km/h; 13 mph)
- Complement: 104; 85 (likely during both her ASW & minesweeping gears were removed, reducing workload)
- Sensors & processing systems: Furuno navigation radar; Sperry Corporation SPS-53A surface search radar; RCA SPN-18 navigation radar
- Armament: 1 × 76mm/50L (3-inch 50-calibres Long) dual-purpose cannon on a Mk.26 mount; 3 × single Bofors 40mm AA rapid-fire cannons; 4 × Mk.10 Oerlikon 20 mm AA rapid-fire cannons; 4 × M2 Browning 50cal (12.7 mm) heavy machine guns; 30cal medium machine guns

BRP Magat Salamat (PS-20) is one of several Miguel Malvar-class corvettes in service with the Philippine Navy. She was originally built as USS Gayety (AM-239), an Admirable-class minesweeper with a similar hull to the PCE-842-class patrol craft produced during World War II. In 1962 she was transferred to South Vietnam for service in the Republic of Vietnam Navy as RVNS Chi Lang II (HQ-08). She was acquired by the Philippine Navy in April 1976 and later on commissioned as Magat Salamat. Along with other ex-World War II veteran ships of the Philippine Navy, she is considered one of the oldest active fighting ships in the world today.

== History ==
=== US Navy ===
Commissioned in the US Navy as USS Gayety (AM-239) in 1945, she was assigned in the Pacific theatre of operations, specifically around the Japanese home islands providing minefield sweeping and anti-submarine warfare patrols in the Ryukyus and off Okinawa. 27 May 1945 She suffered a near-miss from a 500-pound bomb and was damaged with several casualties who were buried at Zamami shima, Okinawa, although she was quickly put back into fighting shape. After the war she was decommissioned in June 1946 and placed in the Atlantic Reserve Fleet.

Gayety was recommissioned on 11 May 1951 as a training ship, and was again decommissioned on 1 March 1954, and re-entered Atlantic Reserve Fleet. As part of the reserves, she was reclassified as MSF-239 on 7 February 1955.

=== Republic of Vietnam Navy ===
She was then transferred to the Republic of Vietnam on 17 April 1962. She served the Vietnamese Navy as RVN Chi Lăng II (HQ-08) up until her escape to the Philippines in 1975, together with other South Vietnamese Navy ships and their respective crew.

=== Philippine Navy ===
She was formally acquired by the Philippine Navy on 5 April 1976, and was commissioned into the Philippine Navy on 7 February 1977 and was renamed RPS Magat Salamat (PS-20). She was renamed to BRP Magat Salamat (PS-20) in June 1980 using a new localized prefix.

In the 1990-1993 overhaul and refit program for the 6 ships of Malvar-class patrol corvettes, PS-20 Magat Salamat wasn't included; and the following year 1994, along with her sistership PS-29 Negros Occidental, both of them was planned to be discarded instead by 1995.

But between 1996 and 1997, the Magat Salamat underwent major overhaul, weapons and radar systems refit, and upgrade of communications gear.

She was assigned with the Patrol Force of the Philippine Fleet, under the jurisdiction of Naval Forces Eastern Mindanao.

In 2011 February, Magat Salamat, together with BRP Felix Apolinario, BRP Teotimo Figuracion, and other Philippine Navy ships and units participated in Exercise PAGSISIKAP 2011 held in Davao Gulf.

In 2 to 10 July 2012, Magat Salamat was one of the participating ships in the Cooperation Afloat Readiness and Training (CARAT) 2012 - Philippines exercises.

In 10 December 2021, Magat Salamat was decommissioned alongside her sister ship Miguel Malvar, in a ceremony at Naval Base Heracleo Alano.

In 28 December 2021, just 15 days after her formal retirement, the Philippine News Agency reported that she will be used "as a temporary command post for the duration of the relief operations in the Dinagat Islands which were severely devastated by Typhoon Odette".

She was finally decommissioned and in 08 May 2026, she was sunk as target in the Balikatan 2026 SINKEX (Sinking Exercise)

== Technical details ==
There are slight difference between BRP Magat Salamat as compared to some of her sister ships in the Philippine Navy, since her previous configuration was as a minesweeper (Admirable class) while the others are configured as rescue escort patrol craft (PCER) and escort patrol craft (PCE) ships which both have no minesweeping equipment.

=== Armaments ===
Originally the ship was armed with one 3"/50-calibers Long dual-purpose gun, one twin Bofors 40 mm guns, six single 20 mm gun mounts, one Hedgehog antisubmarine mortar projector, four K-gun depth charge projectors, and two depth charge racks.

Changes were made during its transfer to the South Vietnamese Navy, as it appears in photos show the removal of her anti-submarine weapons, removal of two Oerlikon 20 mm guns, and addition of single Bofors 40 mm guns. This made the ship lighter and ideal for surface patrols - a gun corvette, but losing her limited anti-submarine warfare capability. The same configuration applies when she was transferred to the Philippine Navy in 1975 up until around 1996–1997.

During its overhaul and refit between 1996 and 1997, the Philippine Navy made some changes in the armament set-up. Photos on 2011 show the Bofors guns still present. Final armaments fitted to the ship are one Mk.26 3"/50-calibersLong cannon (fore), three single Bofors 40 mm cannons (aft), four Mk.10 Oerlikon 20 mm cannons (two each on bridge wings), and four M2 Browning 12.7 mm/.50-caliber machine guns (two besides main bridge, two aft near the lower Bofors gun tub).

=== Electronics ===
She is fitted with Sperry Corporation's SPS-53A surface search radar and RCA SPN-18 navigation radar. Later modifications included the installation of an additional Furuno navigation radar , long range and satellite communications system, and GPS system standard to all Philippine Navy ships.

=== Machinery ===
The ship is originally powered by two Cooper Bessemer GSB-8 diesel engines, but was replaced by two GM 12-567ATL diesel engines, then later by two GM 12-278A diesel engines, with a combined rating of around 2,200 bhp (1,600 kW) driving two propellers. The main engines can propel the 945-ton (full load) ship to a maximum speed of around 16 knots (30 km/h).
