= Dragon Fire (novel) =

2000 novel by Humphrey Hawksley

- Author: Humphrey Hawksley
- Language: English
- Genre: Political thriller, War novel
- Publisher: Pan Macmillan
- Publication date: 24 August 2000
- Publication place: United Kingdom
- Media type: Print (Paperback, Hardcover)
- Pages: 200 (paperback), 384 (hardcover)
- ISBN: 0-330-39156-9
- OCLC: 47726246
- Preceded by: Dragon Strike

Dragon Fire is a 2000 novel by BBC political and foreign correspondent Humphrey Hawksley about a 2007 war between China, India and Pakistan, which draws in Australia, Bhutan, Myanmar, Nepal, New Zealand, Tibet, the United Kingdom, and the United States, and threatens to escalate to nuclear war.

While a work of fiction, the novel attempts to raise awareness of real geopolitical issues in the region.

== Description ==
This novel is set on 3 May 2007. It begins with A SFF (Special Frontier Force) unit led by Major Gendun Choedrak, assaulting Drapchi prison with paratroopers to free Tibetan religious leaders who are being incarcerated there. Far out west, Pakistan launches an attack on the strategic outpost of Kargil, promptly raising the green crescent flag on Indian soil. China accuses India of attacking Chinese soil and declares war.Three nuclear powers: China, India and Pakistan engaged in an escalating combat. Nuclear arsenals are being mobilised. Later Pakistan is devastated while India and China are threatening nuclear war. Russia warned that whichever party involved in the matter will have to face her first. The West's greatest nightmares are becoming true.

== Major themes ==
Significant background themes include:

- Tibet
- The Kashmiri conflict, and especially the Kargil War
- Chinese, Indian and Pakistani nuclear weapons programs
- Relationships between Taiwan and China

== Critical reception ==
John Elliott of the New Statesman said that the novel was a "good read" and that "it is uncomfortably accurate about the dangers facing Asia".
