= Humphrey Hawksley =

English journalist and author

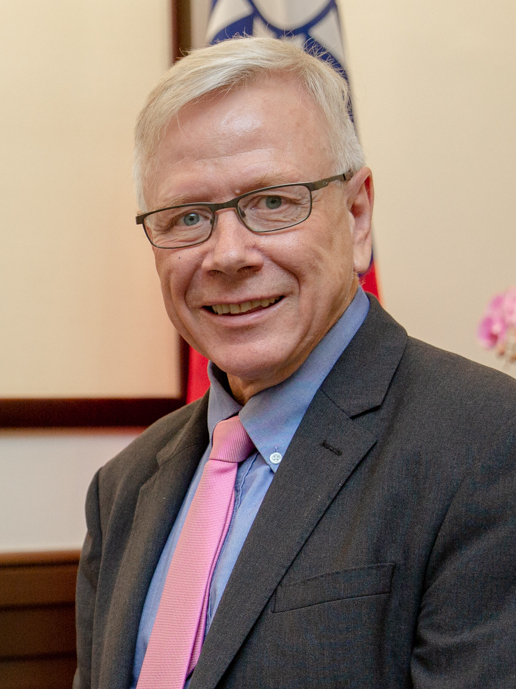
- Hawksley in 2019
- Occupation: Author; journalist; moderator

Website
- www.humphreyhawksley.com

Humphrey Hawksley is an English journalist and author who has been a foreign correspondent for the BBC since the early 1980s.

== Education ==
Hawksley was educated at St Lawrence College, Ramsgate in Kent, after which he joined the Merchant Navy to work his passage to Australia.

== Life and career ==
Humphrey Hawksley has reported on key trends, events and conflicts from all over the world.

His work as a BBC foreign correspondent has taken him to crises on every continent. He was expelled from Sri Lanka, opened the BBC's television bureau in China, arrested in Serbia and initiated a global campaign against enslaved children in the chocolate industry.

His television documentaries include The Curse of Gold and Bitter Sweet, examining human rights abuse in global trade; Aid Under Scrutiny, on the failures of international development; Old Man Atom, that investigates the global nuclear industry; and Danger: Democracy at Work on the risks of bringing Western-style democracy too quickly to some societies.

Humphrey is the author of the acclaimed Future history series, consisting of Dragon Strike, Dragon Fire and The Third World War, that explores world conflict. He has published four international thrillers, Ceremony of Innocence, Absolute Measures, Red Spirit and Security Breach, together with the non-fiction Democracy Kills, a tie-in to his TV documentary on the pitfalls of the modern-day path to democracy from dictatorship.

His work has appeared in The Guardian, The Times, Financial Times, International Herald Tribune, Yale Global and other publications. His university lectures include Columbia, Cambridge, University College London and the London Business School. He is a regular speaker and panelist at Intelligence Squared and the Royal Geographical Society, and he has presented his work and moderated at many literary festivals.

Humphrey has moderated live and online events by The Democracy Forum UK.

== Books ==
=== Non-fiction ===
- Democracy Kills: What's So Good About Having the Vote? (2010)
- Asian Waters (2018)

=== Fiction ===
Hawksley is the author of political novels aimed at raising key strategic issues in the far east before a broader audience.

- Dragon Strike, co-authored with Simon Holberton (1997)
- Ceremony of Innocence (1998)
- Absolute Measures (1999)
- Dragon Fire (2000)
- Red Spirit (2001)
- The Third World War (2003)
- The History Book (2007, re-released as Security Breach in 2008)
- Man on Ice https://www.humphreyhawksley.com/book/man-on-ice/
- Man on Edge https://www.humphreyhawksley.com/book/man-on-edge/
- Home Run
- Friends and Enemies
