= BRP Miguel Malvar (PS-19) =

Philippine Navy warship

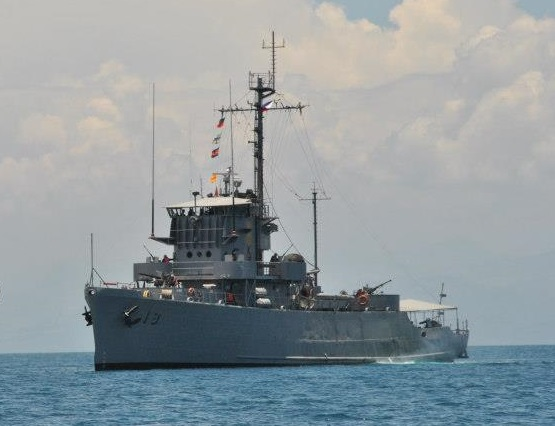
- BRP Miguel Malvar (PS-19)

History

United States
- Name: PCE(R)-852
- Builder: Pullman-Standard Car Manufacturing Co., Chicago, IL
- Laid down: 28 October 1943
- Launched: 1 March 1944
- Commissioned: 26 May 1944
- Renamed: USS Brattleboro (PCE(R)-852), 15 February 1956
- Decommissioned: 1 November 1965
- Fate: transferred to Republic of Vietnam Navy, 11 July 1966

South Vietnam
- Name: Ngọc Hồi (HQ-12)
- Acquired: 11 July 1966
- Fate: Escaped to the Philippines after fall of South Vietnam, 1975

Philippines
- Name: RPS Miguel Malvar (PS-19)
- Namesake: Miguel Malvar y Carpio
- Acquired: 5 April 1976
- Commissioned: 7 February 1977
- Decommissioned: 10 December 2021
- Renamed: BRP Miguel Malvar (PS-19), June 1980
- Fate: Sunk 5 May 2025
- Status: Decommissioned

General characteristics
- Class & type: PCE(R)-848-class patrol craft (in U.S. Navy service)
- Class & type: Miguel Malvar-class corvette (in Philippine Navy service)
- Displacement: 914 long tons (929 t) Full load
- Length: 184.5 ft (56.2 m)
- Beam: 33 ft (10 m)
- Draft: 9.75 ft (2.97 m)
- Installed power: 2,200 hp (1,600 kW)
- Propulsion: Main: 2 × GM 12-278A diesel engines; Auxiliary: 2 × GM 6-71 diesel engines with 100KW gen and 1 × GM 3-268A diesel engine with 60KW gen
- Speed: max 16 knots (30 km/h; 18 mph)
- Range: 6,600 nmi (12,200 km) at 11 kn (20 km/h; 13 mph)
- Complement: 85
- Sensors & processing systems: Raytheon AN/SPS-64(V)11 surface search & navigation radar
- Armament: 1 × US Mk.22 76mm/50L (3-inch 50-calibresLong) dual-purpose cannon; 2 × Bofors 40mm single-barrel AA rapid-fire cannons; 3 × Oerlikon 20 mm AA rapid-fire cannons (or 4 of it); 4 × M2 Browning 50cal (12.7 mm) heavy machine guns; 30cal medium machine guns; Removed Armaments [either during the 1990-1992 overhaul & refit or during 1980's, if not before her transfer to RVNN in 1966]: ASW; 1 × Hedgehog antisubmarine mortar projector; 4 × K-gun depth charge projectors; 2 × depth charge racks; SuW-AAW; 3 × twin-barrel Mk.1 Bofors 40mm AA cannons

BRP Miguel Malvar (PS-19) was the lead ship of the Malvar class of corvettes of the Philippine Navy. She was originally built as USS Brattleboro PCE(R)-852, a PCE(R)-848-class rescue patrol craft escort for the United States Navy during World War II. In 1966 she was transferred to South Vietnam for service in the Republic of Vietnam Navy as RVNS Ngọc Hồi (HQ-12). She was acquired by the Philippine Navy in April 1976 and later on commissioned as Miguel Malvar after Miguel Malvar y Carpio.

== History ==
=== US Navy ===
Commissioned in the US Navy as the USS Brattleboro PCER-852 in 1944, she was first assigned in the Atlantic theatre of operations engaged in patrolling and training. On 1 August 1944, PCER-852 stood out of Bermuda bound for Norfolk, Virginia with 26 prisoners of war—sailors from the German submarine U-505, captured in June by a "hunter-killer" group formed around escort carrier USS Guadalcanal (CVE-60).

Relocating to the Pacific theatre of operations, her duties included treatment of wounded sailors and soldiers, and ASW patrols during the invasion of the Philippines at Leyte Gulf and Lingayen Gulf, and in the operations at Okinawa. During her six months in the war zone, her medical staff and crew handled over 1300 dead, critically wounded, and ships' survivors. After the war she was placed under the Atlantic Reserve Fleet but was not decommissioned.

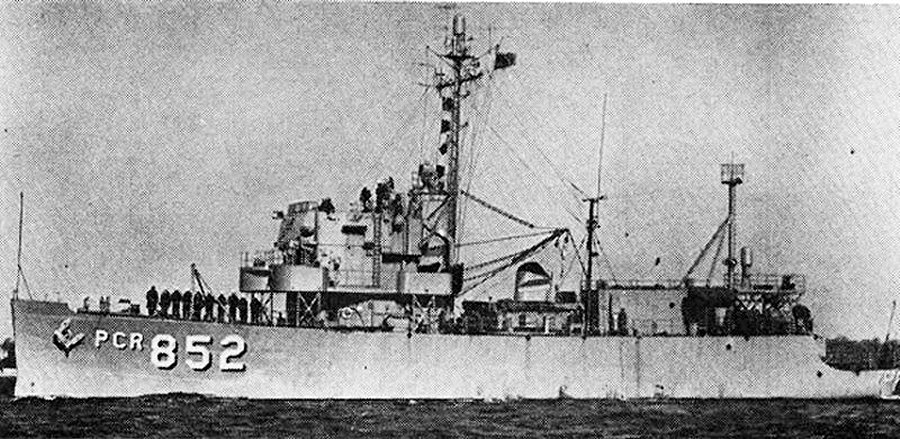
as USS Brattleboro (EPCER-852)

Early in 1946, however, she was converted into an experimental ship to test infrared equipment for the Bureau of Ships. She had her armament removed and her hospital facilities converted to work spaces for test equipment. At that time, she was redesignated E-PCER-852. She completed the conversion in May 1946. In September 1947, the Bureau of Ships shifted the infrared test program to the Naval Underwater Sound Laboratory at New London, Connecticut with E-PCER-852 operating from that base.

For the next 18 years, the ship continued to do experimental work. By the early 1950s the nature of her test work expanded from infrared gear to include optical communications equipment, sonar apparatus, weather gear, and various other items of hardware. In addition to the Bureau of Ships, she did test work for both the Bureau of Ordnance and the Office of Naval Research. On 15 February 1956, the ship was named USS Brattleboro. She continued her experimental duties for nearly a decade after receiving her name. During that time, her zone of operations also expanded to include the coastal waters along the southeastern United States and thence into the West Indies. On 1 October 1965, Brattleboro was ordered to Philadelphia to begin inactivation. Decommissioned at Philadelphia and struck from the Navy list on 1 November 1965.

=== Republic of Vietnam Navy ===
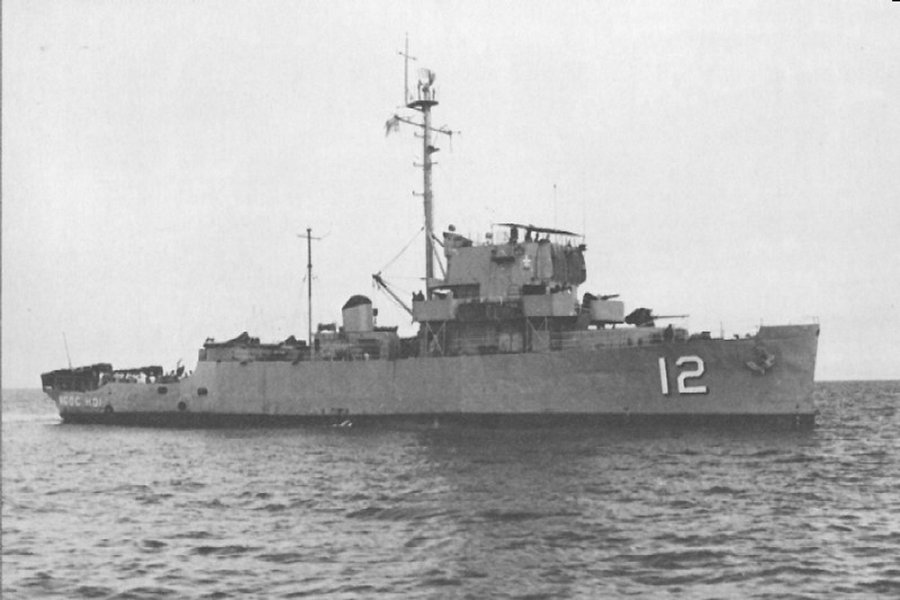
as RVN Ngọc Hồi (HQ-12)

She was then transferred to the Republic of Vietnam on 11 July 1966. She served the Republic of Vietnam Navy as Ngọc Hồi (HQ-12) up until her escape to the Philippines in 1975, together with other South Vietnamese Navy ships and their respective crew.

=== Philippine Navy ===
After she was cleaned, repaired and made ready for service, she was formally acquired by the Philippine Navy on 5 April 1976, and was commissioned together with other ex-RVN ships on 7 February 1977. She underwent extensive overhaul and refitting of armaments, and was commissioned into the Philippine Navy as RPS Miguel Malvar (PS-19).

She initially served the Philippine Navy as RPS Miguel Malvar (PS-19) until she was renamed to BRP Miguel Malvar effective 23 June 1980. Between 1990 and 1992 the Miguel Malvar underwent major overhaul, weapons and radar systems refit, and upgrade of communications gear. She was assigned with the Patrol Force of the Philippine Fleet, and is considered as one of the most decorated ship of the Navy.

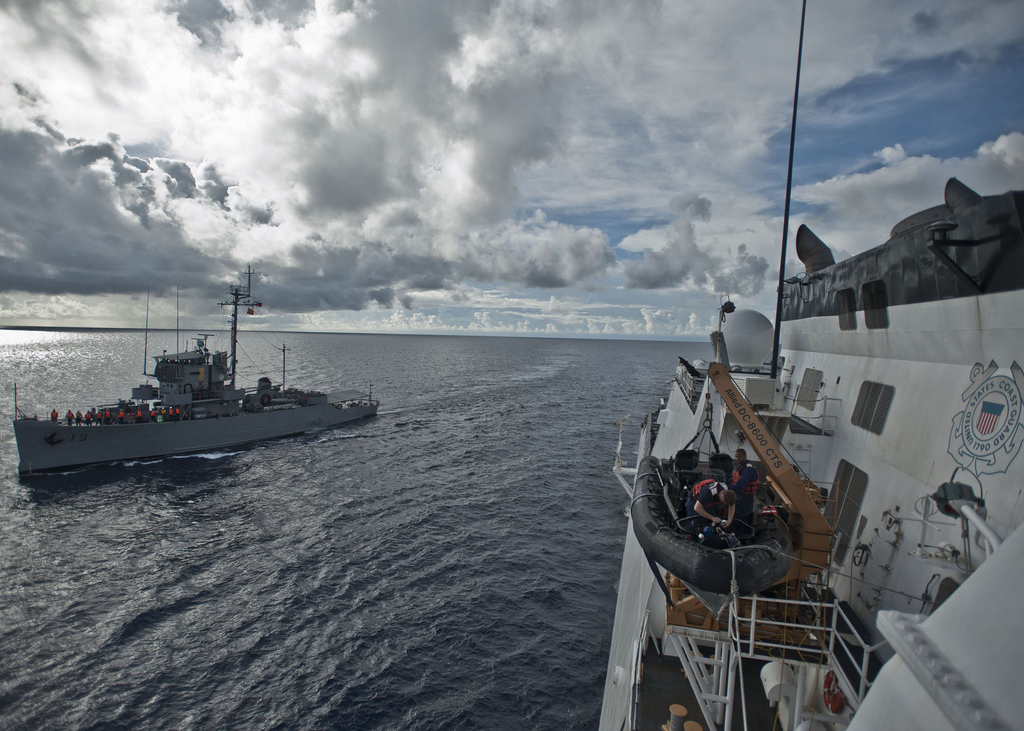
BRP Miguel Malvar (PS 19) steams alongside the national security cutter USCGC Waesche (WMSL 751) during a replenishment at sea approach (RASAP) training event at CARAT 2012 - Philippines.

In August 2011, the Miguel Malvar conducted rescue operations on a distressed vessel in the province of Tawi-Tawi. She rescued around 60 passengers from the wooden-hulled vessel M/L Virginia and towed the said ship to a pier in Bongao, Tawi-Tawi.

The Miguel Malvar was one of the participating ships in the Cooperation Afloat Readiness and Training (CARAT) 2012 - Philippines exercises from 2 to 10 July 2012.

In July 2018, the BRP Miguel Malvar represented the Philippine Navy in a Trilateral Maritime Patrol (TMP) meeting with the Royal Malaysian Navy ships KA Tun Azizan } and KD Todak at the Eastern Sabah Security Zone (ESSZone) in Sabah.

In September 2018, the crew of the BRP Miguel Malvar rescued and evacuated at least 50 families from a huge fire that broke out near the pier where the ship was docked in Bongao, Tawi-Tawi. Two teams from the ship was sent to combat the fire until firemen arrived. The fire started at 2:30 am and lasted for three (3) hours, burning down several buildings and houses.

In December 2020, the ship responded to a distress call and rescued 33 people off the coast of Langahan Island, Tawi-Tawi after their vessel, the M/L Utoh Salon damaged its engine shaft and went adrift for several hours. The BRP Malvar then towed the vessel and bought its occupants back to Tawi-Tawi.

Miguel Malvar was decommissioned alongside her sister ship Magat Salamat on 10 December 2021, in a ceremony at Naval Base Heracleo Alano.

On 25 April 2025, the US Navy announced that the ship will be sunk during the exercise Balikatan 2025. On 5 May 2025 the Philippine Navy announced that the ship had sunk that morning in rough weather 30nm west of San Antonio, Zambales, before it could be sunk as a target.

== Technical details ==
There are slight difference between the BRP Miguel Malvar as compared to some of her sister ships in the Philippine Navy, since her original configuration was as a rescue patrol craft escort (PCER), while the others are configured as patrol craft escorts (PCE) and minesweepers (Admirable class).

=== Armaments ===
Originally the Miguel Malvar was armed with one 3"/50-caliber dual-purpose gun, two single Bofors 40 mm guns, four Oerlikon 20 mm cannons, one Hedgehog depth charge projector, four depth charge projectiles (K-guns) and two depth charge tracks.

During its overhaul and refit between 1990 and 1991, the Philippine Navy removed her old anti-submarine weapons and systems, and made changes in the armament set-up. Some sources claim the loss of its two Bofors 40mm cannons during the 1990-1991 overhaul and refit period,. Final armaments fitted to the ship are one Mk.22 3"/50-caliber gun, two single Bofors 40 mm cannons, three Mk.10 Oerlikon 20 mm cannons, and four M2 Browning 12.7 mm/.50-caliber machine guns. This made the ship lighter and ideal for surface patrols, but losing her limited anti-submarine warfare capability.

=== Electronics ===
Also during the refit the ship's SPS-21D surface search radar and RCA SPN-18 navigation radar was replaced by a Raytheon AN/SPS-64(V)11 surface search and navigation radar system. Later modifications included the installation of a satellite communications system and GPS system standard to all Philippine Navy ships.

=== Machinery ===
The ship is powered by two GM 12-278A diesel engines with a combined rating of around 2,200 bhp (1,600 kW) driving two propellers. The main engines can propel the 914 tons (full load) ship to a maximum speed of around 16 knots (30 km/h).

== Gallery ==
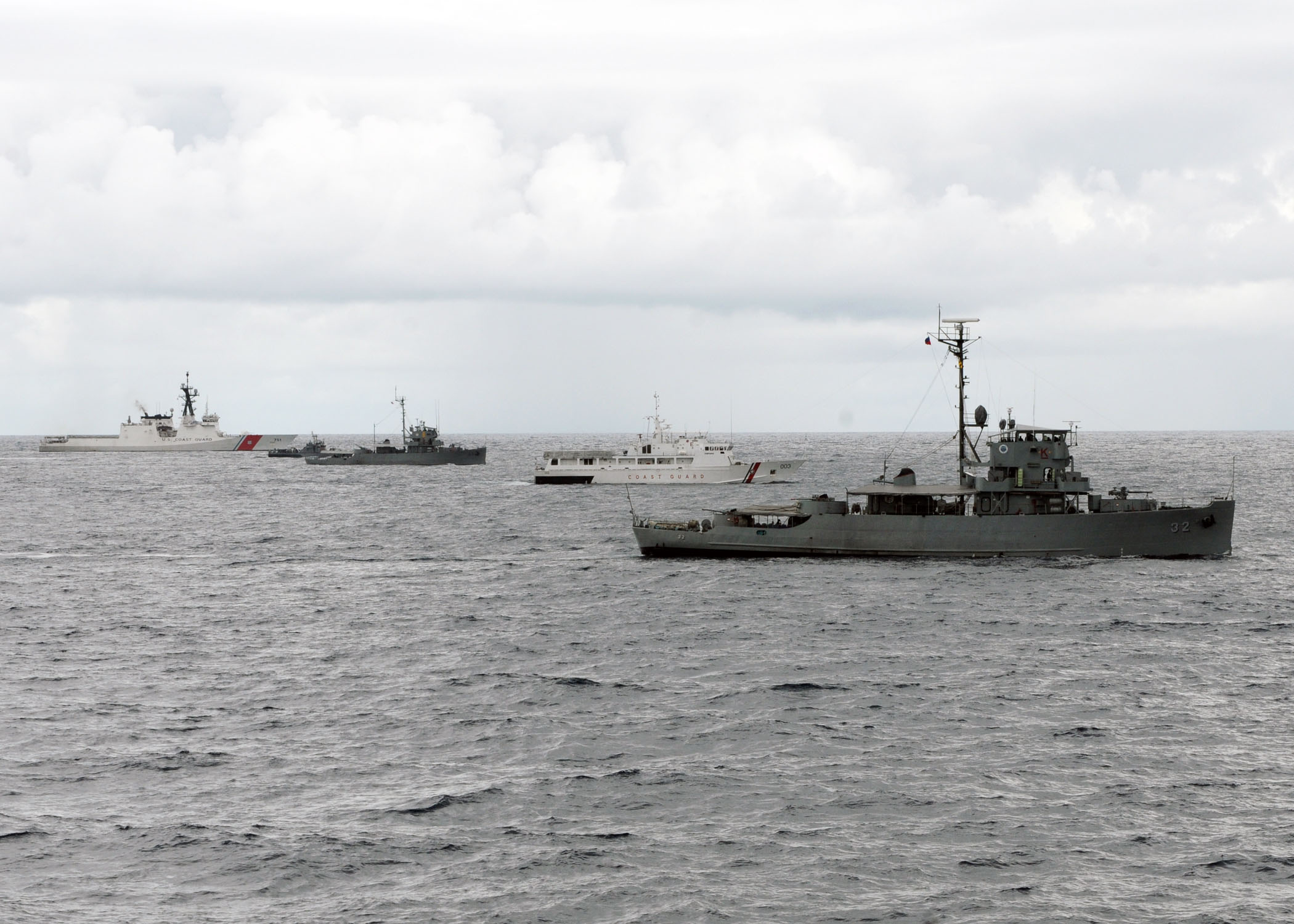
BRP Iloilo (PS-32), BRP Pampanga (SARV-003), BRP Miguel Malvar (PS-19), BRP Salvador Abcede (PG-114) and USCGC Waesche (WMSL-751) join USS Vandegrift (FFG-48) for a photo exercise (PHOTOEX) during CARAT 2012-Philippines

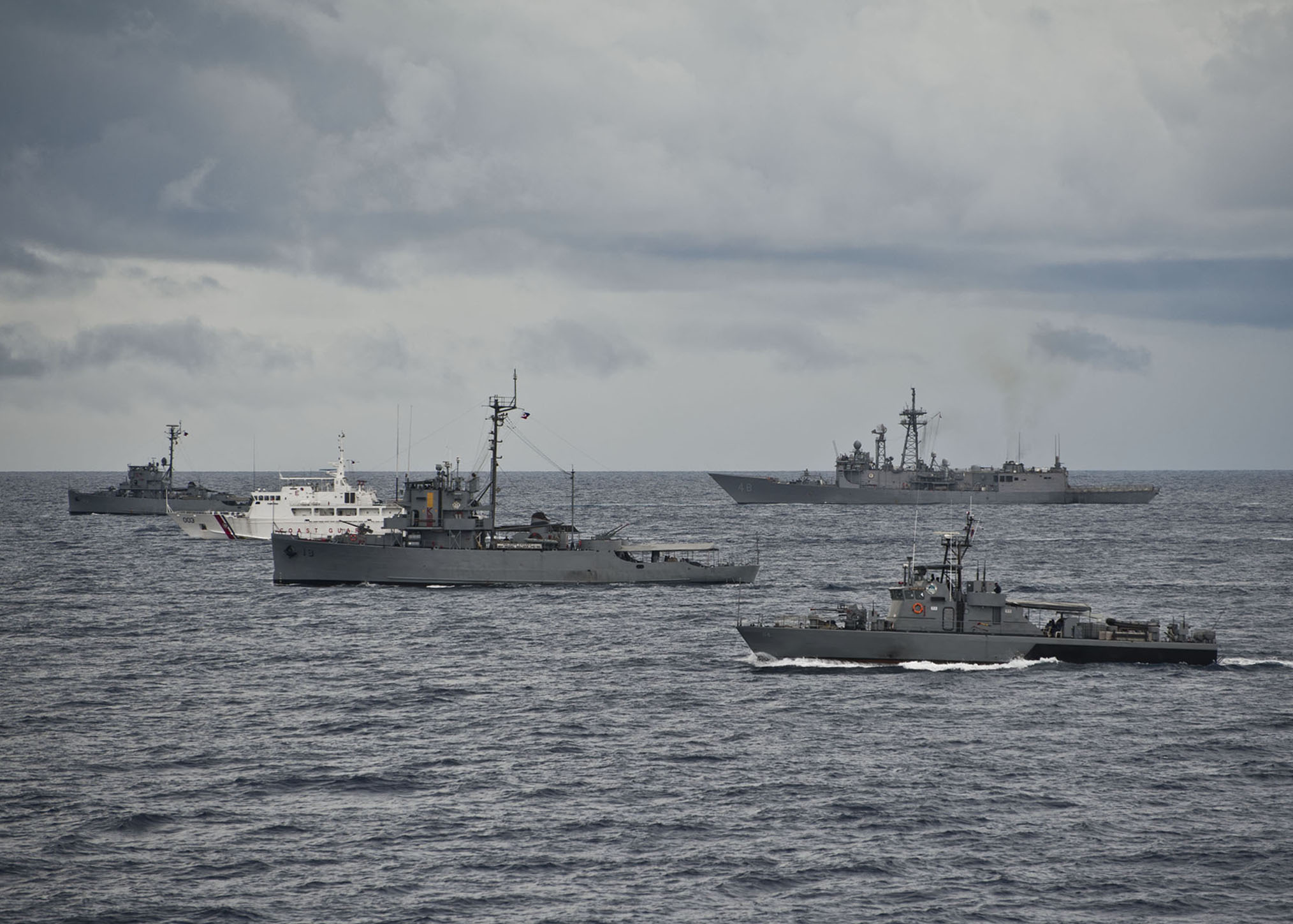
BRP Salvador Abcede (PG-114), BRP Miguel Malvar (PS-19), BRP Iloilo (PS-32), BRP Pampanga (SARV-003), and USS Vandegrift (FFG-48) for a photo exercise (PHOTOEX) during CARAT 2012-Philippines

== See also ==
- Patrol craft
