= Julia Becerra Malvar =

Spanish aristocrat (1892–1974)

Julia Becerra Malvar was one of the most important characters in Galicia at the beginning of the 20th century.

== Origins ==
Julia Becerra Malvar was born in the family palace in Salcedo (Pontevedra, Galicia, Spain) on 9 April 1892. On her father's side, she was related to the Becerra family. Her father, Manuel Becerra, together with other Galician noblemen, gifted King Alfonso XIII the Island of Cortegada. Both her uncle and her grandfather, her parental relatives, were Ministers of the Republic Government. On her mother's side, she was related to Archbishop Malvar and to the famous writer Emilia Pardo Bazán. The marriage had five children, their names were Mercedes, Teresa, Josefina, Julia and Joaquín.

== Childhood ==
Julia Becerra came from a noble family from Galicia. She grew up in an environment that encouraged her political interests and her admiration for her homeland, Galicia. When she was young, she lived in Pontevedra. She spent her summer time in Barrantes, a little village in the province of Pontevedra, where her family owned a palace (Pazo de Barrantes) Julia and her sisters did not go to school, however they had a private teacher at home. Julia had an original personality. She was very intelligent, open-minded, funny although naughty. When she was ten years old she traveled to Paris to take care of her aunt. She lived there for six years. She went to Paris to study hat design, opera, piano and moreover, dress making. One of her childhood anecdotes was told by her granddaughter, Maria Cristina Cebrián Sagarriga. When Julia was a child she wrote a false note to her nanny saying: "Give me twenty "duros" or I will detonate the bomb", because the nanny did not let her get out of the Salcedo Palace. After that, the nanny sent a telegram to her parents saying: "There is a bomb. I am leaving." This is just an example of her many pranks as a child.

== Early adulthood ==
Julia did not go to college because women could not go in those days. When she was 12 years old she went to Paris to look after her aunt. There, she studied singing at the conservatoire. She also studied dressmaking and hat design. In 1910, when she was going to make her debut at the Milan's Scala, her father brought her back to Spain because he did not want her to be a singer. In revenge, Julia married Vicente Sagarriga, three months after she met him. They met in a racecourse in Madrid Julia was 18 years old and Vicente was 22. Before her first daughter was born, she wanted to move to Santiago de Compostela because she wanted her daughter to be Galician. Her hobbies were music and gardening, also she liked cooking and designing clothes for herself and her family. She never had a job she was paid for, but she was a nurse at the World War II. Moreover, she sang for charitable causes. She defended Galicia's culture and language. Besides she was a feminist. This ideology was unusual in the society of that time.

== Late adulthood ==
Julia Becerra Malvar met Vicente Sagarriga at the racecourses in Madrid. He was a rich landowner from Valencia. He was the earl of Creixell and also he was a lawyer. Three months after they met, when Julia was eighteen and Vicente was twenty-two, they married. Her parents gave them the Barrantes Palace. They had two children. Julia was born on 9 June 1911 and Cristina on 6 September 1920. In the winter, they used to live in Madrid and in the summer they would go to Barrantes for the holiday. However, when the earl of Creixell fell ill with tuberculosis, in 1933, they decided moved into the Barrantes Palace. He died on 11 May 1935. Julia was married for the second time to Frank Eric Arbenz. He was Swiss and he was the delegate of the International Red Cross in Spain. During the Second World War Julia went around Europe with her second husband. She helped in the humanitarian work, hospitals and refugee camps. As it was told by her granddaughter Cristina Cebrián, Julia was really impressed by all the technological and medical advances that she could see at the American hospitals. When the war was finished, Eric and Julia came back to Spain. The hardest years for Julia started when her son-in-law, Jaime Cebrián, died in 1962. Three years later her second husband died too. However, the worst moment of her life was when her two daughters and two grandsons died in a traffic accident in 1967. Julia suffered so much. However, because of her inner strength, she was able to go forward with her family. According to her granddaughter Cristina, who was pregnant at that time, Julia did not let them wallow in their misery, instead she forced them to go on with their lives.

== Social and political life ==
Julia grew up in an atmosphere which encouraged her political interests and her adoration for her home village. When she was little she had a lot of influences which drove her to her interest in politics. On her father' side she had relatives who were ministers of the nation during the first and the second republic. However, her father, who was the mayor of Pontevedra, was a monarchic man. She was educated by particular teachers, as in that time very few women received some type of education. Later, she liked music but her parents thought that she could have a more important occupation. When she became an adult and a married woman, she was a woman anticipated to her time, she was very liberal, independent and very interested in politics and her home village, Barrantes. Consequently, when she was married her parents gave her "El Pazo de Barrantes" where she spent all the summers. She was very interested in the people from Barrantes, the farmers, the poverty, the insolation and so on. Her friends had a political ideology which helped her to define her own ideology; that is, a mixture of pro-Galician feeling, pro-land reform movement and conservative ideas. Due to all these ideas she met Ramón Cabanillas, Cambó and José Sánchez Guerra. On 25 September 1930, several important galician intellectuals and Julia met in Pazo de Barrantes to write a document which demanded the rights of Galicia. This is known as the Barrantes agreement (Pacto de Barrantes). This contract was signed by Ramón Cabanillas, Paz Andrade, Basilio Álvarez and others..... except Julia because she was a woman. This caused her to have problems with her family and some of her politician friends. During the Primo de Rivera dictatorship, Julia Becerra, a woman with strong democratic convictions, was as dissatisfied with the dictatorship as her friend José Sánchez Guerra. Otherwise she had a good relationship with the general Primo de Rivera. As a consequence we can tell she was an open-minded woman, because she was friends with very different people. Julia, countess of Creixel, was always between the devil and the deep blue sea because although she was in favour of the Republic, she was a friend of the king Alfonso XIII too. Besides the people who met in Barrantes were not in favour of the republican regime because the contract was judged in a very different way outside Barrantes. After the republic reclamation Julia participated more in politics, for instance she ran as a deputy in the province of Pontevedra, although she was not elected. During the Spanish Civil war she had a lot of contacts in the republican party, so she helped a lot of people who had their lives in danger.She contributed to saving a considerable number of lives thanks to her links to the organization "Socorro Blanco" The Spanish Civil war was a hard time for everybody. Her granddaughter Cristina Cebrián explains that thanks to the Barrantes Palace's house keepers, Julia and her family never lacked food or money because they kept all her shares despite the war. Some years later, she renounced to give up politics when the Civil war finished with the democracy in Spain.

== Later life ==
Julia spent the final years of her life in Spain, in Barrantes to be precise, after performing humanitarian works around Europe during W.W.II. She liked talking with her neighbours, in particular she was very interested in town problems. Although she liked singing and playing the piano for her family, Julia also loved working in the fields, specially during the grape harvest. She used to work elbow to elbow with the country people. Julia spoke Galician with them, even though she usually spoke Spanish and French with her family. Something very special for her was to visit the Mosteiro Fair (A Feira de Mosteiro) where people traded with cattle. Besides she also liked discussing prices with the traders. During 1962, Julia lived through a hard time, when her son-in-law Jaime Cebrián died. However, in 1965 the situation was made worse when her second husband, Arbenz, died. Although the hardest was in 1967, when her two daughters and two of her grandchildren died in a car accident. She was sad in her later life because she had painful losses in her family. People who remember her talk about her strength and about her bravery despite her disgrace. She gave a lot of courage to her grandchildren so that they could get over their mothers' death. It should be mentioned that she donated a great part of her land so that the local school was built, just because she loved Barrantes and its inhabitants very much. The school is called nowadays CPI Julia Becerra Malvar in her honour. In her last years, she went blind, which changed her life considerably. Julia died on 27 April 1974 in Madrid, when she was 82. She had a very interesting although hard life, in particular when her daughters died. In spite of her many achievements, she is not a well-known character of the 20th century in Galicia. In May 2009, her ashes were moved to the Barrantes cemetery.
