= RPS Leyte =

History

United States
- Name: USS PCE-885
- Builder: Albina Engine and Machine Works, Portland, Oregon
- Laid down: 25 February 1944
- Launched: 20 June 1944
- Commissioned: 30 April 1945
- Fate: transferred to the Philippine Navy, July 1948

History

Philippines
- Name: RPS Leyte (E-30)
- Namesake: Leyte is one of the provinces in the Visayas, Philippines.
- Commissioned: 1948
- Decommissioned: 1979
- Renamed: RPS Leyte (PS-30), 1965
- Fate: ran aground and sank, 1979

General characteristics
- Class & type: PCE-842-class patrol craft (in U.S. Navy service)
- Class & type: Miguel Malvar-class corvette (in Philippine Navy service)
- Displacement: 880.8 Tons (Full Load)
- Length: 184.5 ft (56.2 m)
- Beam: 33 ft (10 m)
- Draft: 9.75 ft (2.97 m)
- Propulsion: Main: 2 × GM 12-567A diesel engines; Auxiliary: 2 × GM 6-71 diesel engines with 100KW gen and 1 × GM 3-268A diesel engine with 60KW gen
- Speed: 16 Knots (maximum),
- Endurance: 5370 nmi
- Complement: around 77
- Armament: 1 × 3"/50-caliber gun (76 mm) Mk22 dual-purpose gun; 3 × twin Bofors 40 mm gun; 5 × Oerlikon 20 mm cannon; 4 × Depth Charge Projectors; 1 × Hedgehog Projector; 2 × Depth Charge tracks

RPS Leyte (PS-30) was a Miguel Malvar-class corvette of the Philippine Navy. She was originally built as USS PCE-885, a PCE-842-class patrol craft for the United States Navy during World War II. She was decommissioned from the U.S. Navy and transferred to the Philippine Navy in July 1948 and renamed Leyte. The ship was decommissioned from the Philippine Navy in 1979 after she ran aground and was damaged beyond repair.

== History ==
Commissioned in the US Navy as USS PCE-885 in 1945, and was decommissioned after World War II.

She was then transferred and commissioned into the Philippine Naval Patrol and was renamed RPS Leyte (E-29) in July 1948. She was carried over to the Philippine Navy in 1951, and was reclassified as RPS Leyte (PS-30 in 1965. She was stricken in 1979 after being grounded near Wallace Air Station in Poro Point, La Union.

=== Grounding ===
After undergoing repairs at the Cavite Naval Dockyard in 1979, she was immediately assigned to escort RPS Ang Pangulo, the presidential yacht, which was docked at San Fernando, La Union after being used by President Ferdinand Marcos in a trip to Baguio City. Without undergoing sea trials and with an impending storm, Leyte proceeded to La Union. Caught in the storm and radar-less, one of her engines failed, but she still proceeded to her destination. Upon nearing the area of the Wallace Air Station, she found herself parallel with the coastline, and was hit by a huge wave that threw the ship into the rocky coast off Wallace Air Station. Grounded, her crew was secured from the waves and no fatalities were reported.

The Philippine Navy was unable to recover the ship, and she was stricken in the same year.

== Technical details ==
Originally the ship was armed with one 3"/50-caliber dual-purpose gun, three twin Bofors 40 mm guns, five 20 mm Oerlikon guns, 1 Hedgehog depth charge projector, four depth charge projectiles (K-guns) and two depth charge tracks.

There were slight differences between the RPS Leyte as compared to some of her sister ships in the Philippine Navy, since her previous configuration was as a patrol craft escort, while the others are configured as minesweepers and patrol craft escort rescue ships.
