= BRP Sultan Kudarat =

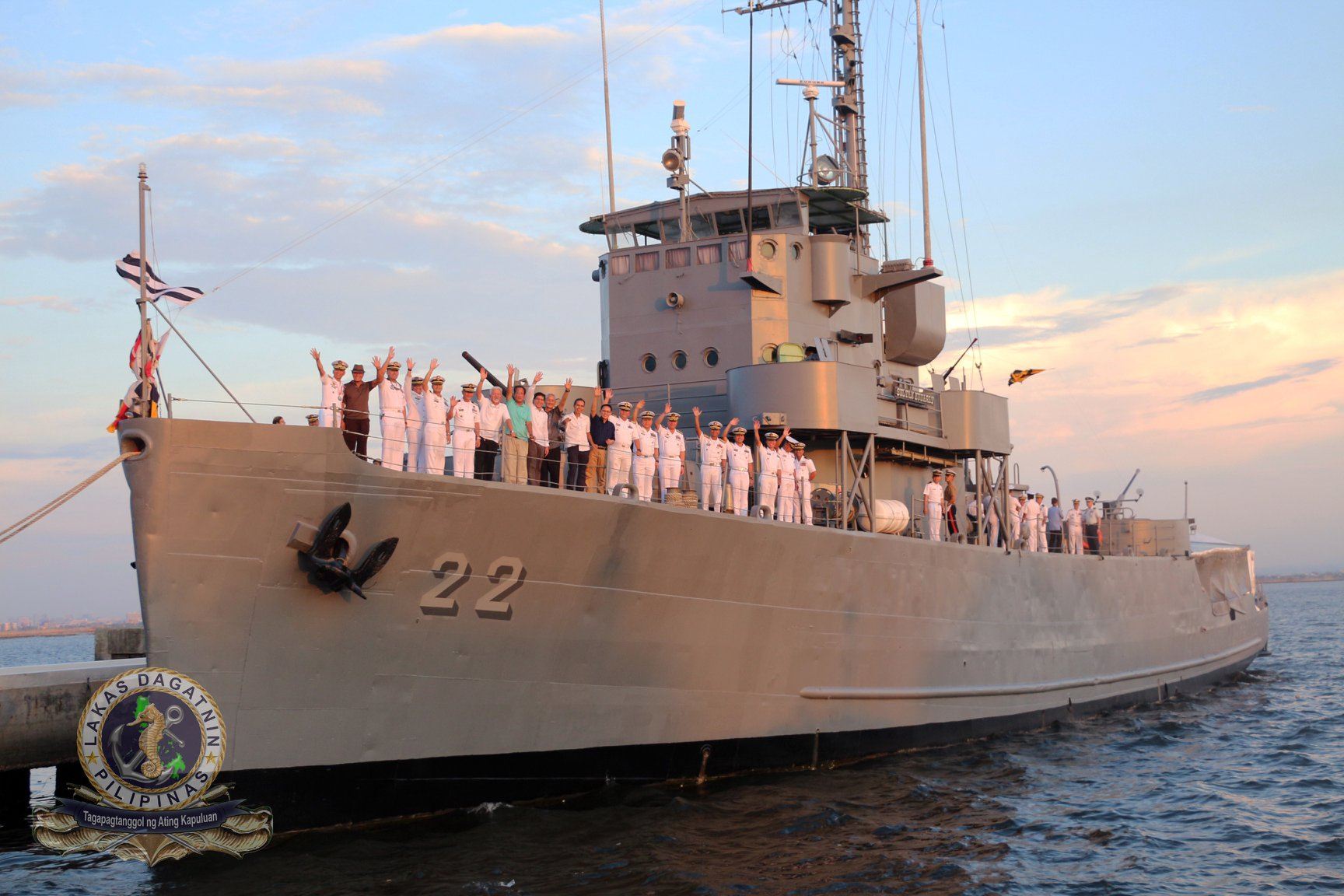
- BRP Sultan Kudarat during its decommissioning on July 5, 2019.

History

United States
- Name: PCE-895
- Builder: Willamette Iron and Steel Corp., Portland, OR
- Laid down: December 2, 1942
- Launched: May 18, 1943
- Commissioned: October 30, 1944
- Renamed: USS Crestview (PCE-895), February 15, 1956
- Fate: transferred to the Republic of Vietnam Navy, November 29, 1961

South Vietnam
- Name: Đống Đa II
- Acquired: November 29, 1961
- Fate: Escaped to the Philippines after the fall of South Vietnam, 1975

Philippines
- Name: Sultan Kudarat
- Namesake: Sultan Muhammad Dipatuan Kudarat, a Sultan of Maguindanao from 1619 to 1671.
- Acquired: April 5, 1976
- Commissioned: July 27, 1976
- Decommissioned: July 5, 2019
- Renamed: BRP Sultan Kudarat (PS-22), June 1980
- Fate: Seen capsized October 30, 2022

General characteristics
- Class & type: PCE-842-class patrol craft (in U.S. Navy service)
- Class & type: Miguel Malvar-class corvette (in Philippine Navy service)
- Displacement: 914 Tons (Full Load)
- Length: 184.5 ft (56.2 m)
- Beam: 33 ft (10 m)
- Draft: 9.75 ft (2.97 m)
- Installed power: 2,200 hp (1,600 kW)
- Propulsion: Main: 2 × GM 12-278A diesel engines; Auxiliary: 2 × GM 6-71 diesel engines with 100KW gen and 1 × GM 3-268A diesel engine with 60KW gen
- Speed: 16 knots (30 km/h; 18 mph) (maximum),
- Range: 6,600 nmi (12,200 km; 7,600 mi) at 11 knots (20 km/h; 13 mph)
- Complement: 85
- Sensors & processing systems: Raytheon AN/SPS-64(V)11 Surface Search / Navigation Radar; Furuno navigation radar
- Armament: 1 × Mk.26 3"/50-caliber gun dual-purpose gun; 3 × single Bofors 40 mm gun; 4 × Mk.10 Oerlikon 20 mm guns; 4 × M2 .50 cal (12.7 mm) machine guns

BRP Sultan Kudarat (PS-22) was a Miguel Malvar-class corvette of the Philippine Navy. It was originally built as USS PCE-895, a PCE-842-class patrol craft for the United States Navy during World War II. In 1961 it was transferred to South Vietnam for service in the Republic of Vietnam Navy as RVNS Đống Đa II (HQ-07). It was acquired by the Philippine Navy in April 1976, and was commissioned later on as RPS Sultan Kudarat (PS-22). Along with other World War II-era ships of the Philippine Navy, Sultan Kudarat was considered one of the oldest active fighting ships in the world, until its retirement in July 5, 2019.

== History ==
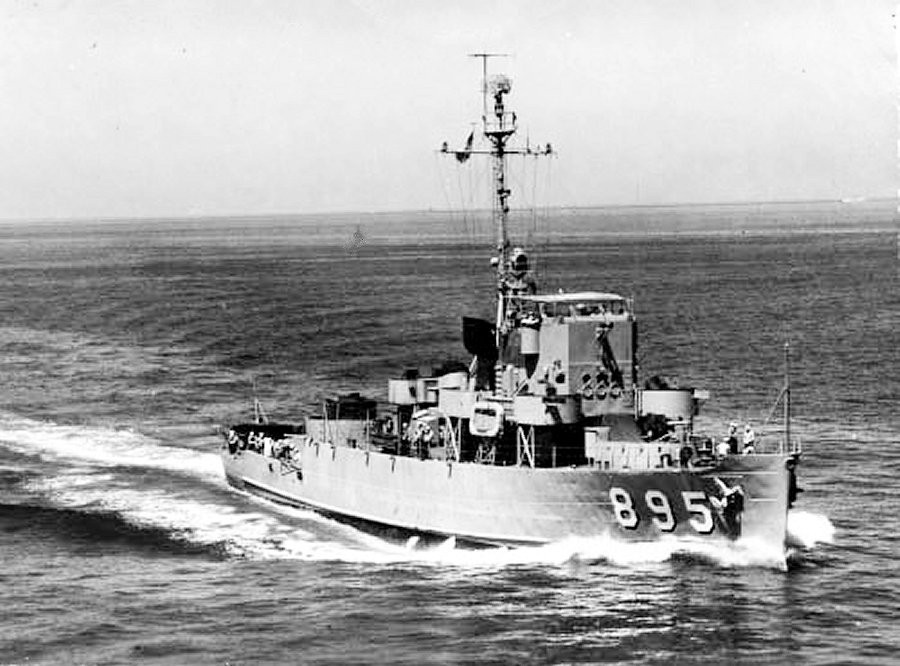
USS PCE-895

Commissioned in the US Navy as USS PCE-895 in 1944, she was renamed USS Crestview (PCE-895) on February 15, 1956, named for the City of Crestview, Florida, "in accordance with a recent Navy decision to name its patrol vessels, previously known only by the hull number, by the names of cities of the United States with populations between 2,500 and 10,000".

She was then transferred to the South Vietnam on November 29, 1961. She served the Republic of Vietnam Navy as RVNS Đống Đa II (HQ-07) up until her escape to the Philippines in 1975, together with other South Vietnamese Navy ships and their respective crew.

She was formally acquired by the Philippine Navy on April 5, 1976, and was commissioned into the Philippine Navy on July 27, 1976, and was renamed RPS Sultan Kudarat (PS-22). She was renamed to BRP Sultan Kudarat (PS-22) in June 1980 using a new localized prefix.

Between 1990 and 1991 the Sultan Kudarat underwent major overhaul, weapons and radar systems refit, and upgrade of communications gear.

She was assigned with the Patrol Force, later on the Offshore Patrol Force of the Philippine Fleet. BRP Sultan Kudarat was decommissioned on July 5, 2019.

In October 2022, the Ship along with the BRP Rajah Humabon (PS-11) and BRP Cebu (PS-28) was seen tilted over and submerged at the Naval Station Pascual Ledesma in Cavite after the onslaught of Severe Tropical Storm Nalgae.

== Technical details ==
There are slight differences between the BRP Sultan Kudarat as compared to some of her sister ships in the Philippine Navy, since her previous configuration was as a patrol craft escort (PCE), while the others are configured as rescue patrol craft escort (PCER) and minesweepers (Admirable class) ships.

=== Armaments ===
Originally the ship was armed with one Mk.26 3"/50-caliber dual-purpose gun, three single Bofors 40 mm guns, one Hedgehog depth charge projector, four depth charge projectiles (K-guns) and two depth charge tracks. Changes were made during its transfer to the South Vietnamese Navy, as it appears in photos show the removal of her anti-submarine weapons, and addition of four Mk.10 Oerlikon 20 mm guns. This made the ship lighter and ideal for surface patrols, but losing her limited anti-submarine warfare capability. The same configuration applies when she was transferred to the Philippine Navy up until around 1990–1991.

During its overhaul and refit between 1990 and 1991, the Philippine Navy made some changes in the armament set-up. Some sources claim the loss of its three Bofors 40mm cannons during the 1990–1991 overhaul and refit period, but photos as of 2009 show the Bofors guns still present. Final armaments fitted to the ship are one Mk.26 3"/50-caliber gun (fore), three single Bofors 40 mm cannons (aft), four Mk.10 Oerlikon 20 mm cannons (2 each on bridge wings), and four M2 Browning .50 cal (12.7 mm) caliber machine guns (2 besides main bridge, 2 aft near the lower Bofors gun tub).

=== Electronics ===
Also during the refit the ship's RCA CRM-NIA-75 surface search radar and RCA SPN-18 navigation radar was replaced by a Raytheon AN/SPS-64(V)11 surface search and navigation radar system. Later modifications included the installation of an additional Furuno navigation radar, long range and satellite communications system and GPS system standard to all Philippine Navy ships.

=== Machinery ===
The ship is powered by two GM 12-278A diesel engines, with a combined rating of around 2,200 bhp (1,600 kW) driving two propellers. The main engines can propel the 914 tons (full load) ship to a maximum speed of around 16 knots (30 km/h).

Recent photos show that air-conditioning was also installed on the Sultan Kudarat.
