= Malvar-class corvette =

1976 class of Philippine Navy corvettes

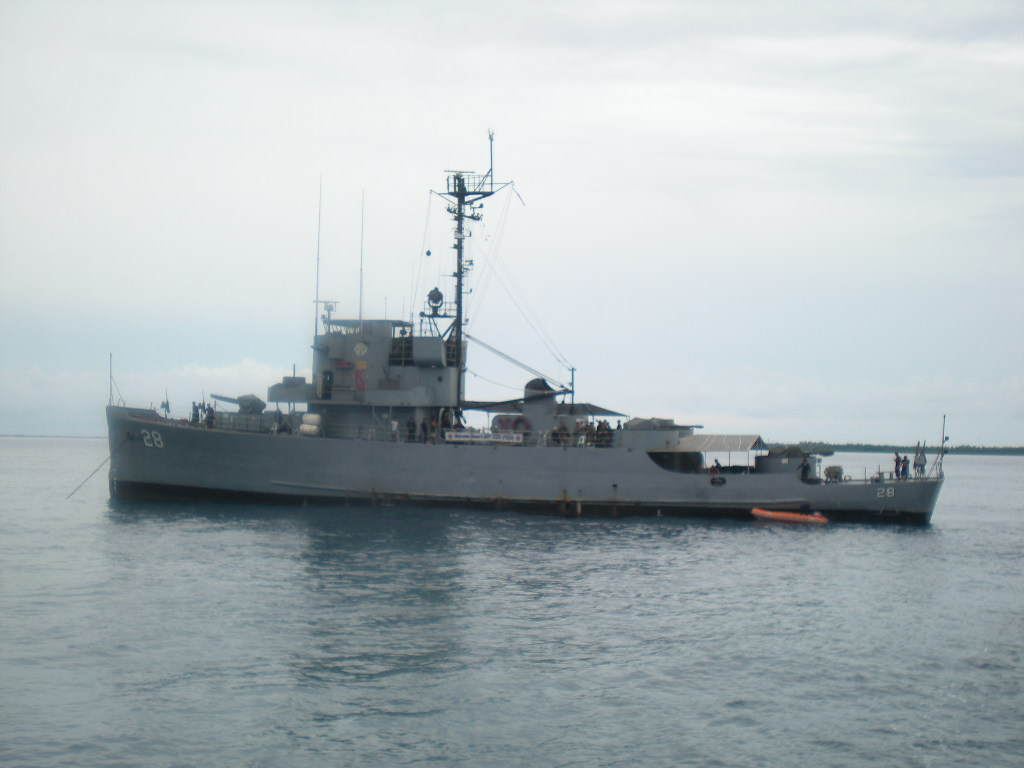
- BRP Cebu (PS-28)

Class overview
- Name: Malvar class
- Builders: Pullman Standard Car Manufacturing Co.; Albina Engine and Machine Works; Willamette Iron and Steel Corp.; Winslow Marine Railway and Shipbuilding; US
- Operators: Philippine Navy
- Succeeded by: Rizal class
- Active: 0
- Lost: 1
- Retired: 9

General characteristics
- Type: Patrol corvette (as originally transferred); Gun corvette (later, upon removal of all ASW ability)
- Displacement: 914 tons (full load); 640 tons (standard)
- Length: 184.5 ft (56.2 m)
- Beam: 33 ft (10 m)
- Draft: 9.4 ft (2.9 m) on PCE-842-class patrol craft hulls; 9.75 ft (2.97 m) on Admirable-class minesweeper hulls
- Installed power: 3 gens; 2 × GM6-71 diesel engines with 100KW gen; 1 × GM3-268A diesel engine with 60KW gen
- Propulsion: 2 × GM12-278A diesel engines with a combined 2,200 hp (1,600 kW); (previous) 2 × GM12-567ATL diesel engines; (original) 2 × Cooper Bessemer GSB-8 diesel engines
- Speed: from last engine replacement: 1.6MW power; 16 knots max; 14 knots sustained; 12 knots economy; from original engines or 1st replacement or both; 15.7 knots max (on PCE-842-class patrol craft hulls); 14.8 knots max (on Admirable-class minesweeper hulls)
- Range: 6,600 nmi at 11 knots (20 km/h)
- Complement: 85
- Sensors & processing systems: Raytheon AN/SPS-64(V)11 nav & surface-search radar (1990-1992 refits: PS-19, PS-22, PS-31, & PS-32) (1992-1993 refits: PS-23 & PS-28); SPS-50 Surface Search Radar (on PS-23); SPS-21D Surface Search Radar (on PS-19 and PS-28); CRM-NIA-75 Surface Search Radar (on PS-29, PS-31, and PS-32); SPS-53A Surface Search Radar (on PS-20); RCA SPN-18 I/J-band Navigation Radar; Sonar (either removed during 1990-1993 overhaul & refits or 1980s; if not in the 1960s for the 5 ships that arrived in 1975)
- Armament: SuW-AAW; 1 × 76mm L/50 (3-inch 50-caliberLong) dual-purpose cannon on a Mk.22 mount; Bofors 40mm AA rapid-fire cannons (in 1 of ff config): 3 × twin-barrel; 2 × single-barrel; 3 × single-barrel (claimed from some photo sources); none at all (transferred to PhMC for their ground-based AA weapons); Oerlikon 20 mm AA rapid-fire cannons: 3 or 4 units); 4 × M2 Browning 50cal (12.7 mm) heavy machine guns; A number of 30cal medium machine guns; Removed Armaments; 4 of 1st 6 ships transferred in 1948: Either during the 1990-1993 overhaul & refits Or the 1980s); Last 5 ships arrived in 1975: Either during 1960s before their transfer to RVNN Or (except maybe PS-18) along with 4 of the 1st 6 ships; ASW; 1 × Hedgehog antisubmarine mortar projector; 4 × K-gun depth charge projectors; 2 × depth charge rails; SuW-AAW; Bofors 40mm twin-barrel AA rapid-fire cannons (either only certain ships or all the remaining ships); MCM gears (from the 3 minesweeper-variant hulls Admirable-class)

The Malvar class was a ship class of patrol corvettes of the Philippine Navy whose last class members were decommissioned in 2021. These ships were formerly used by the US Navy as Admirable-class minesweepers, and PCE-842-class and PCE(R)-848 class patrol craft, which were both based on the Admirable-class hull. In the Philippine Navy, the vessels have undergone upgrades and modifications, and have been re-categorized as corvettes. One ship, the ex-USN USS Quest was converted into a non-combatant Presidential Yacht by the Philippine Navy in 1948 as RPS Pag-asa (APO-21) (later on renamed as RPS Santa Maria, and as RPS/BRP Mount Samat)

In 2021 December 10, the remaining two ships of the class were finally decommissioned. That event was supposed to mark the end of the era of using WW2 combatant ships in the Philippine Navy, but supertyphoon Odette hit the Philippines just 6 days after their decommissioning, and so the Philippine Navy was forced to briefly reactivate BRP Magat Salamat (PS-20) "with a volunteer force composed mainly of its last crew" to serve as a temporary command post for the duration of the relief operations in the severely affected Dinagat Islands.

== History ==
The PCE class of naval ships served with the United States Navy during the Second World War.

Out of the reserved US Navy units, six were transferred to the Philippines as part of the US Military Assistance Program (PS-28 to PS-33), while five were former South Vietnamese Navy units that escaped to the Philippines in 1975.

With 40 years of active duty with the Philippine Navy, ships of this class have been involved in local and international crisis, exercises, and incidents.

In 2021 December 10, the last two Malvar-class corvettes, Magat Salamat and Miguel Malvar were decommissioned in a ceremony at Naval Base Heracleo Alano. That event was supposed to mark the end of the era of using WW2 combatants because the remaining WW2-era vessels left during that time are the five armed transport-types (3 LCUs & 2 LSTs). However, 15 days after her formal retirement, the Philippine News Agency reported that Magat Salamat would be briefly be reactivated "as a temporary command post for the duration of the relief operations in the Dinagat Islands which were severely devastated by Typhoon Odette," "with a volunteer force composed mainly of its last crew" to serve as a temporary command post for the duration of the relief operations in the severely affected Dinagat Islands.

== Technical details ==
Originally the ship was armed with one 3" (76mm) L/50 dual-purpose gun, two to six Bofors 40 mm guns, 1 Hedgehog depth charge projector, four depth charge projectiles (K-guns) and two depth charge tracks.

The same configuration applied up until the late 1980s when the Philippine Navy removed most of its old anti-submarine weapons and systems, losing its already-limited ASW abilities, but installed three 20 mm Oerlikon guns and four 12.7 mm heavy machine guns, making them lighter and more suited for surface patrols.

The ship was originally powered by two Cooper Bessemer GSB-8 diesel engines, but these were replaced by two GM 12-567ATL diesel engines similar to her sister ships, with a combined rating of around 1,710 bhp (1,280 kW). These were then again replaced in the mid 1990s with two GM 12-278A diesels with a combined rating of around 2,200 bhp (1,600 kW) driving two propellers. The main engines can propel the 914-ton (full load) ship to a maximum speed of around 16 knots (30 km/h).

== Ships in class ==
Ship name	Bow number	Launched	Commissioned	Decommissioned	Service	Status
BRP Datu Tupas	PS-18	14 November 1943	5 April 1976	1977	Patrol Force	Used as parts hulk for sisterships.
BRP Miguel Malvar	PS-19	1 March 1944	7 February 1977	10 December 2021	Offshore Combat Force	Decommissioned
BRP Magat Salamat	PS-20	19 March 1944	7 February 1977	10 December 2021	Offshore Combat Force	Briefly reactivated as temporary command post in Dinagat Islands as reported in 2021 Dec 28
BRP Sultan Kudarat	PS-22	18 May 1943	22 July 1976	5 July 2019	Offshore Combat Force	Capsized at Sangley Point, Cavite
BRP Datu Marikudo	PS-23	18 March 1944	5 April 1976	9 December 2010	Patrol Force	Sold for scrap; equipment stripped as spare parts
BRP Cebu	PS-28	10 November 1943	2 July 1948	1 October 2019	Offshore Combat Force	Capsized at Sangley Point, Cavite.
BRP Negros Occidental	PS-29	24 February 1944	2 July 1948	9 December 2010	Patrol Force	Sold for scrap; equipment stripped as spare parts
RPS Leyte	PS-30	20 June 1944	2 July 1948	1979	Patrol Force	Grounded and lost in 1978.
BRP Pangasinan	PS-31	24 April 1943	2 July 1948	1 March 2021	Offshore Combat Force	Sunk as target for SINKEX phase of Exercise Balikatan 2023 on 26 April 2023.
BRP Iloilo	PS-32	3 August 1943	2 July 1948	September 2016	Offshore Combat Force	Weapons, machinery & electronics stripped for spare parts; hull awaiting disposal
RPS Samar	PS-33	20 November 1943	24 May 1948	1960	Patrol Force	After Decommissioning from Philippine Navy, she was transferred to the Bureau of Coast and Geodetic Survey in 1960.She was renamed RPS RESEARCH and served with BCGS until 1975 and eventually returned to the Philippine Navy and Probably Scrapped. Source: NAMRIA INFOMAPPER July 2001 issue and CDR Mark R Condeno

== Gallery ==
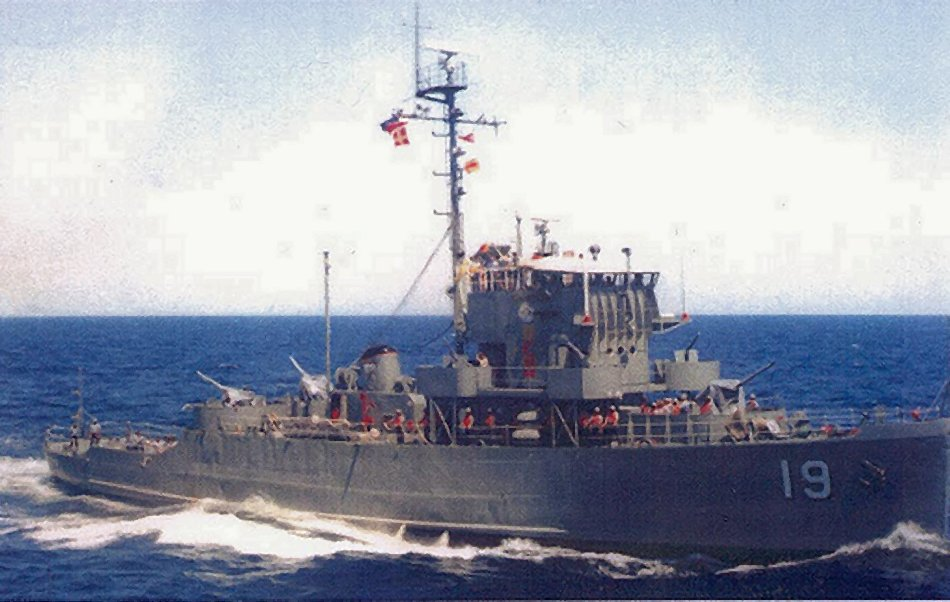
BRP Miguel Malvar (PS-19)

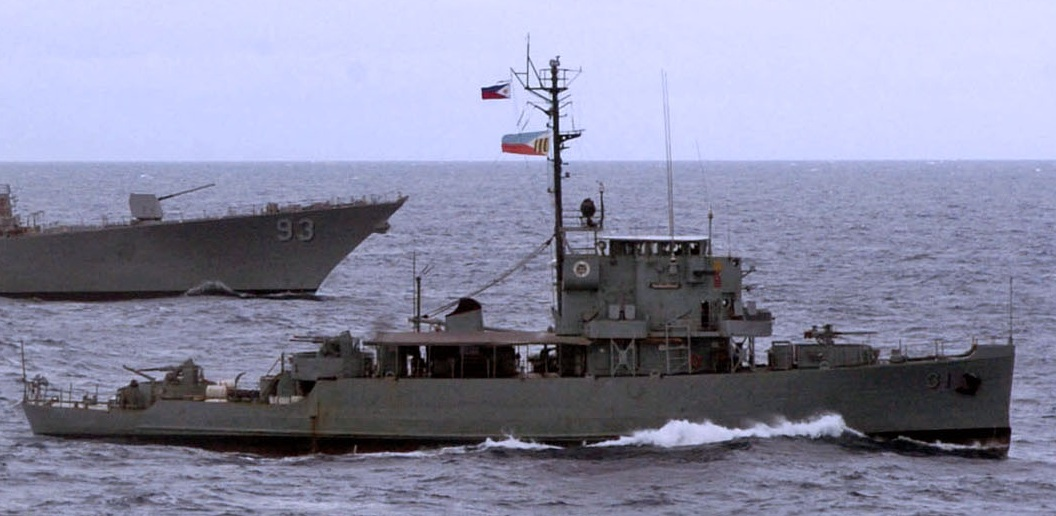
BRP Pangasinan (PS-31) at CARAT 2011-Philippines

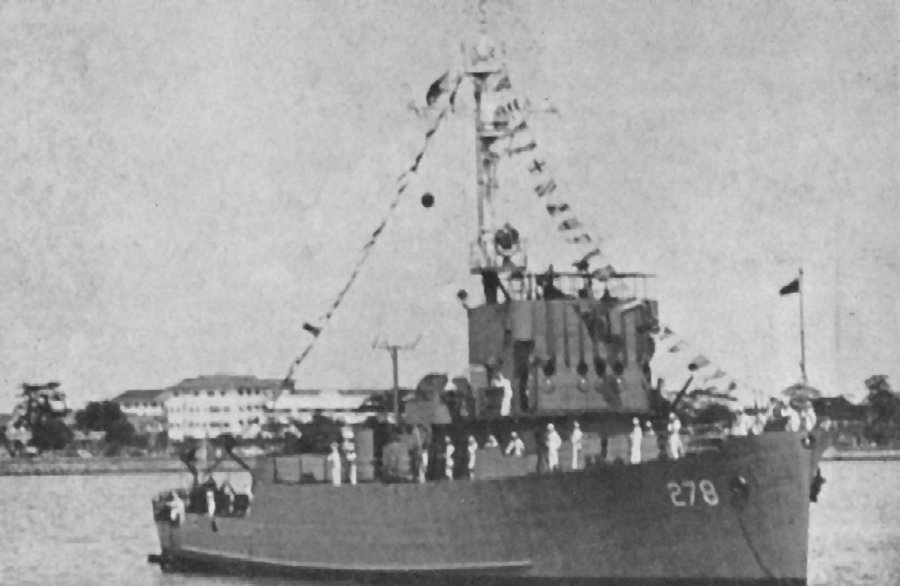
RPS Samar (M-33) flying Philippine colors but still wearing U.S. Navy hull number circa 1948.
