= Dragon Strike (novel) =

1997 Book by Humphrey Hawksley and Simon Holberton

- First edition cover
- Author: Humphrey Hawksley and Simon Holberton
- Publisher: Sidgwick & Jackson
- Publication date: 1 January 1997
- ISBN: 978-0-283-06306-0

Dragon Strike: A Novel of the Coming War with China is the first novel written by British journalists Humphrey Hawksley and Simon Holberton and first published in 1997, concerning a hypothetical war in 2001.

The novel weaves the story of China attacking Vietnam, Taiwan, Malaysia and Philippines to fortify its territorial claims to the oil-rich South China Sea. This attack was ordered by Wang Feng, the fictional new leader of China. Japan, the United States and other countries are eventually brought into the conflict, putting the world at the brink of a nuclear war. The story illustrates the complex relations between the United States and China on economic ties and ideologies.

Humphrey Hawksley subsequently wrote another novel concerning a hypothetical war in Asia: Dragon Fire.
