= BRP Pangasinan =

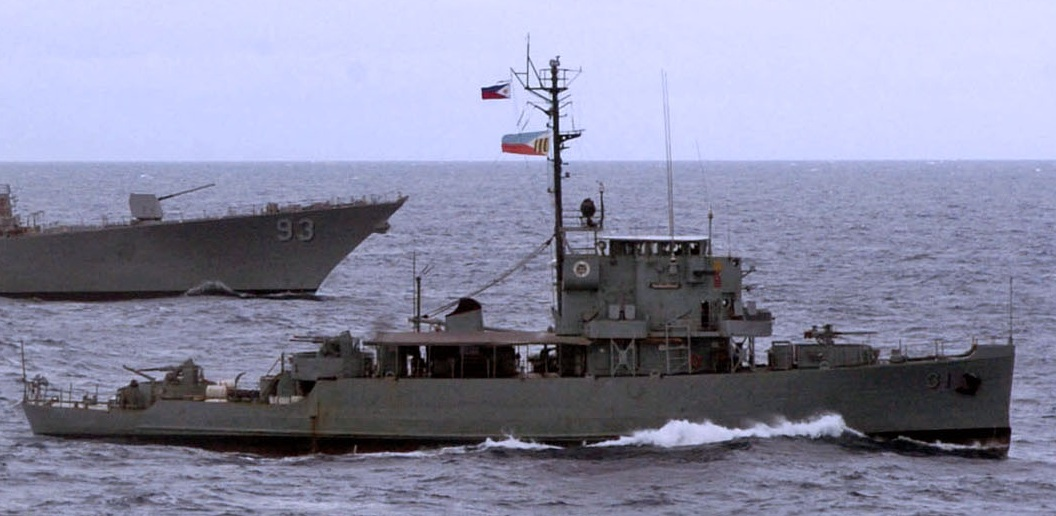
- BRP Pangasinan (PS-31) at CARAT Philippines 2011

History

United States
- Name: PCE-891
- Builder: Willamette Iron and Steel Works, Portland, Oregon
- Laid down: 28 October 1942
- Launched: 24 April 1943
- Commissioned: 15 June 1944
- Fate: transferred to the Philippine Navy, July 1948

History

Philippines
- Name: Pangasinan
- Namesake: Philippine province of Pangasinan
- Acquired: 2 July 1948
- Commissioned: 2 July 1948
- Decommissioned: 1 March 2021
- Renamed: RPS Pangasinan (PS-31), 1965; BRP Pangasinan (PS-31), June 1980
- Fate: Sunk as target, 26 April 2023
- Status: Decommissioned

General characteristics
- Class & type: PCE-842-class patrol craft (in U.S. Navy service)
- Class & type: Miguel Malvar-class corvette (in Philippine Navy service)
- Displacement: 914 Tons (Full Load)
- Length: 184.5 ft (56.2 m)
- Beam: 33 ft (10 m)
- Draft: 9.75 ft (2.97 m)
- Installed power: 2,200 hp (1,600 kW)
- Propulsion: Main: 2 × GM 12-278A diesel engines; Auxiliary: 2 × GM 6-71 diesel engines with 100KW gen and 1 × GM 3-268A diesel engine with 60KW gen
- Speed: 16 knots (30 km/h; 18 mph) (maximum),
- Range: 6,600 nmi (12,200 km; 7,600 mi) at 11 knots (20 km/h; 13 mph)
- Complement: 85
- Sensors & processing systems: Raytheon AN/SPS-64(V)11 Surface Search / Navigation Radar; Furuno navigation radar
- Armament: 1 × 76mm/50L (3-inch 50-calibresLong) dual-purpose cannon on a Mk.26 mount; 3 × Bofors 40mm twin-barrel AA rapid-fire cannons (if not removed in this ship); 4 × Mk.10 Oerlikon 20 mm AA rapid-fire cannons (or just 3 units); 4 × M2 Browning 50cal (12.7 mm) heavy machine guns; 30cal medium machine guns; Removed Armaments (either during the 1990-1992 overhaul & refit or the 1980s ): ASW; 1 × Hedgehog antisubmarine mortar projector; 4 × K-gun depth charge projectors; 2 × depth charge racks

BRP Pangasinan (PS-31) was a Miguel Malvar-class corvette of the Philippine Navy. She was originally built as USS PCE-891, a PCE-842-class patrol craft for the United States Navy during World War II. She was decommissioned from the U.S. Navy and transferred to the Philippine Navy in July 1948 and renamed RPS Pangasinan (E-31).

Along with other World War II-era ships of the Philippine Navy, Pangasinan was considered one of the oldest active fighting ships in the world, up until its decommissioning on 1 March 2021 after 72 years of service.

The ship was subsequently used as the target during a Sinking Exercise (SINKEX) conducted as part of Exercise Balikatan 2023. She was sunk off the coast of Zambales on April 26, 2023.

== History ==
Commissioned in the US Navy as USS PCE-891 in 1944, and was decommissioned after World War II.

She was then transferred and commissioned into the Philippine Naval Patrol and was renamed RPS Pangasinan (E-31) in 1948. She was carried on to the Philippine Navy in 1951, and in 1965 she was renamed as RPS Pangasinan (PS-31) using a new ship naming and classification system. Again in June 1980 she was renamed BRP Pangasinan (PS-31) using a new localized prefix.

Between 1990 and 1991 the 'ship underwent major overhaul, weapons and radar systems refit, and upgrade of communications gear.

She was assigned with the Patrol Force of the Philippine Fleet, which was later renamed as the Offshore Combat Force.

She was formally retired on 1 March 2021 together with BRP Quezon (PS-70), BRP Salvador Abcede (PC-114), and BRP Emilio Liwanag (PC-118).

The ship was subsequently used as the target during a Sinking Exercise (SINKEX) conducted as part of Exercise Balikatan 2023, and was sunk off the coast of Zambales on 26 April 2023.

== Notable deployments / exercises ==
On 16 July 1973, Pangasinan under the command of Lt. Cdr. Arturo Y. Capada (PN), dispatched a motor whale boat operated by ET3 Celso Rosario (PN) and rescued a Philippine Constabulary detachment of 9 troopers from Tandu Batu, Luuk, Sulu. ET3 Rosario died in the said rescue operation, which earned him the Philippine Medal of Valor.

In August 2002, she was also one of the Philippine Navy ships which rescued Filipino refugees from Sabah beating the 24 August 2002 deadline imposed by the Malaysians for undocumented workers to leave.

On 14 October 2003 while conducting patrol operations along the Philippine-Malaysian border, Pangasinan apprehended a motor launch carrying some R3.5 million worth of smuggled goods off Tawi-Tawi.

Last 20 May 2008, as part of a composite team from the Philippine Army 53rd Infantry Battalion, Philippine Navy - Naval Forces Western Mindanao, and the Philippine National Police, she joined a raid on the island of Ticala, San Pablo, Zamboanga del Sur, in order to put an end to sea robberies and extortion in the waters of Illana Bay.

In July 2011, Pangasinan, together with BRP Rizal (PS-74) and US Navy ships USS Howard (DDG-83) and USS Chung-Hoon (DDG-93), took part in the sea phase bilateral exercises Cooperation Afloat Readiness and Training (CARAT) Philippines 2011.

In August 2019, the ship transported relief goods for victims of the twin Earthquakes that happened in July 2019 in Itbayat, Batanes. The goods consisted of 795 sacks of family food packs, 312 boxes of relief supplies, 32 25-kg sacks of rice, 10 50-kg sacks of rice, six boxes of sardines, eight boxes of instant noodles, six boxes of instant coffee, 30,000 liters of mineral water, and 92 boxes of assorted grocery items.

== Technical details ==
There were slight difference between the BRP Pangasinan as compared to some of her sister ships in the Philippine Navy, since her previous configuration was as a patrol craft escort (PCE), while the others are configured as rescue patrol craft escort (PCER) and minesweepers (Admirable class) ships.

=== Armaments ===
Originally the ship was armed with one forward Mk.26 3 in (76 mm)/50-caliber dual-purpose gun, three aft twin Mk.1 Bofors 40 mm guns, four Mk.10 20 mm Oerlikon guns, 1 Hedgehog depth charge projector, four depth charge projectiles (K-guns) and two depth charge tracks. This configuration applies before its overhaul in the early 1990s.

During its overhaul and refit between 1990 and 1991, the Philippine Navy removed her old anti-submarine weapons and systems, and made some changes in the armament set-up. Some sources claim the loss of its three Bofors 40mm cannons during the 1990-1991 overhaul and refit period,. Final armaments fitted to the ship were one Mk.26 3"/50-caliber gun (fore), three twin Mk.1 Bofors 40 mm cannons (aft), four Mk.10 Oerlikon 20 mm cannons (2 each on bridge wings), and four M2 Browning .50 cal (12.7 mm) caliber machine guns (two besides main bridge, two aft near the lower Bofors gun tub). This made the ship lighter and ideal for surface patrols, but losing her limited anti-submarine warfare capability.

=== Electronics ===
Also during the refit the ship's RCA CRM-NIA-75 surface search radar and RCA SPN-18 navigation radar was replaced by a Raytheon AN/SPS-64(V)11 surface search and navigation radar system. Later modifications included the installation of an additional Furuno navigation radar , long range and satellite communications systems, and GPS system standard to all Philippine Navy ships.

=== Machinery ===
The ship was powered by two GM 12-278A diesel engines with a combined rating of around 2,200 bhp (1,600 kW) driving two propellers. The main engines can propel the 914 tons (full load) ship to a maximum speed of around 16 knots (30 km/h).

== Gallery ==
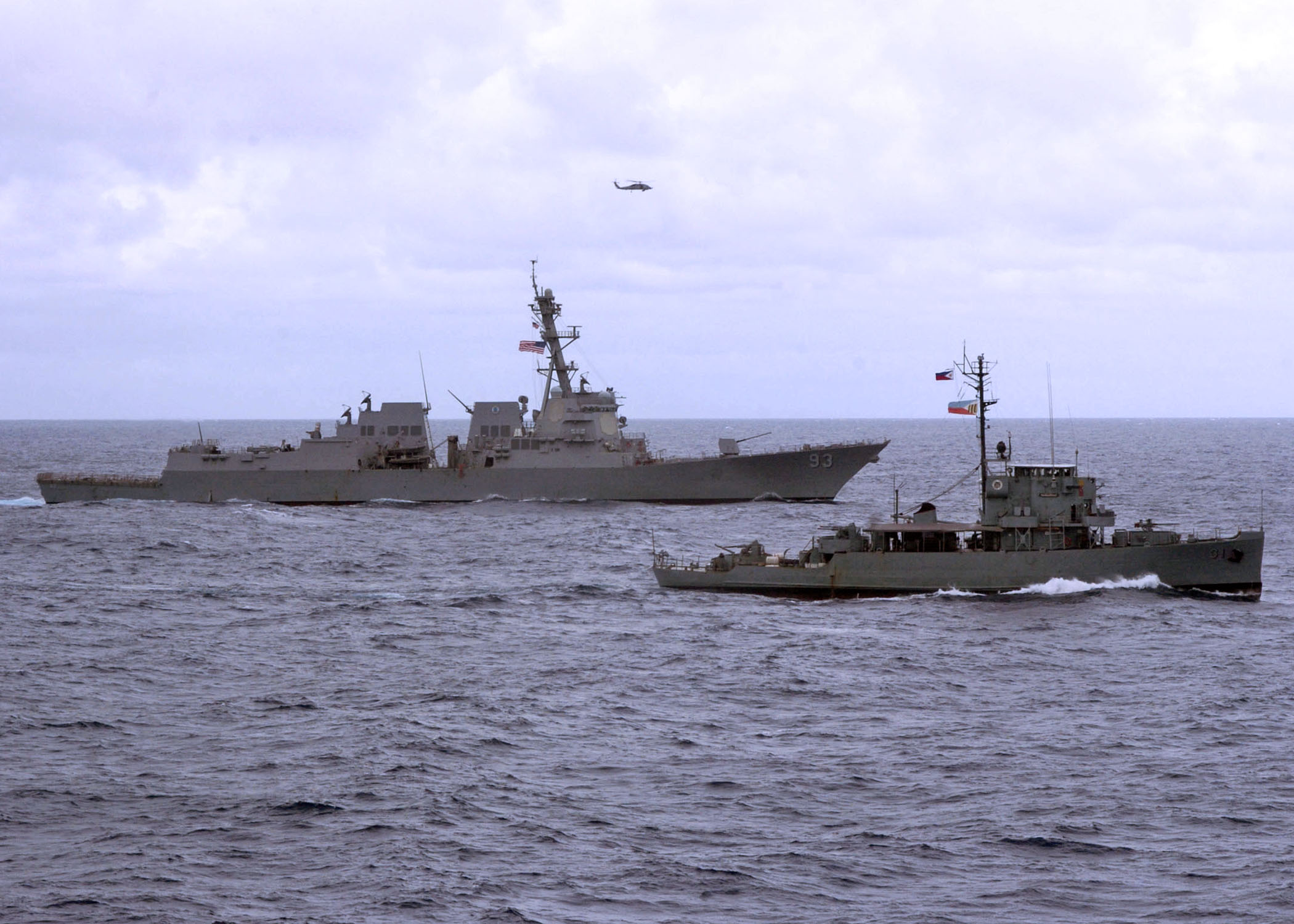
Representing the Philippine Navy, with USS Chung-Hoon (DDG-93) at CARAT Philippines 2011 exercise with the US Navy.

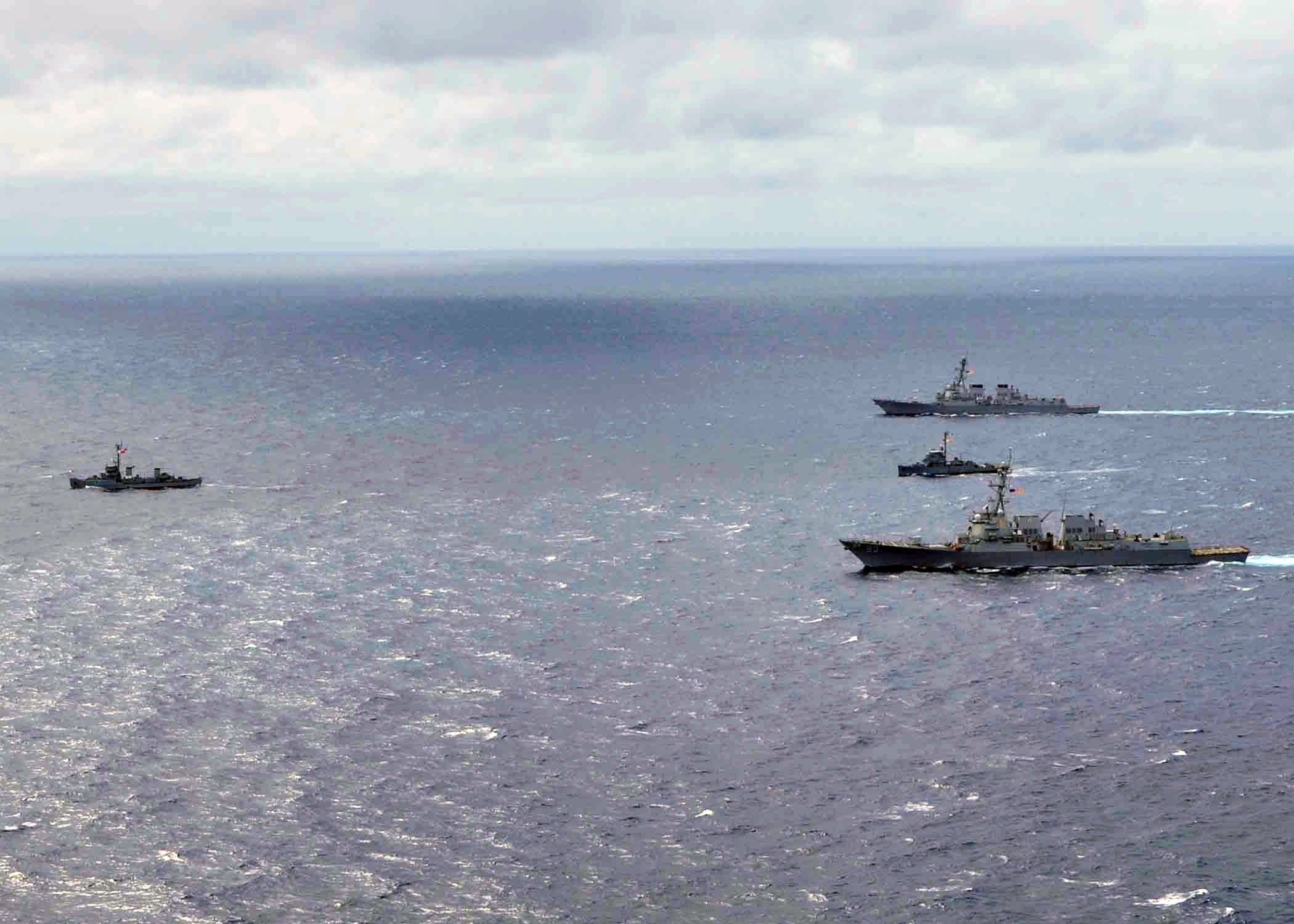
with BRP Rizal (PS-74), USS Chung-Hoon (DDG-93), and USS Howard (DDG-83) at CARAT Philippines 2011 exercise with the US Navy.

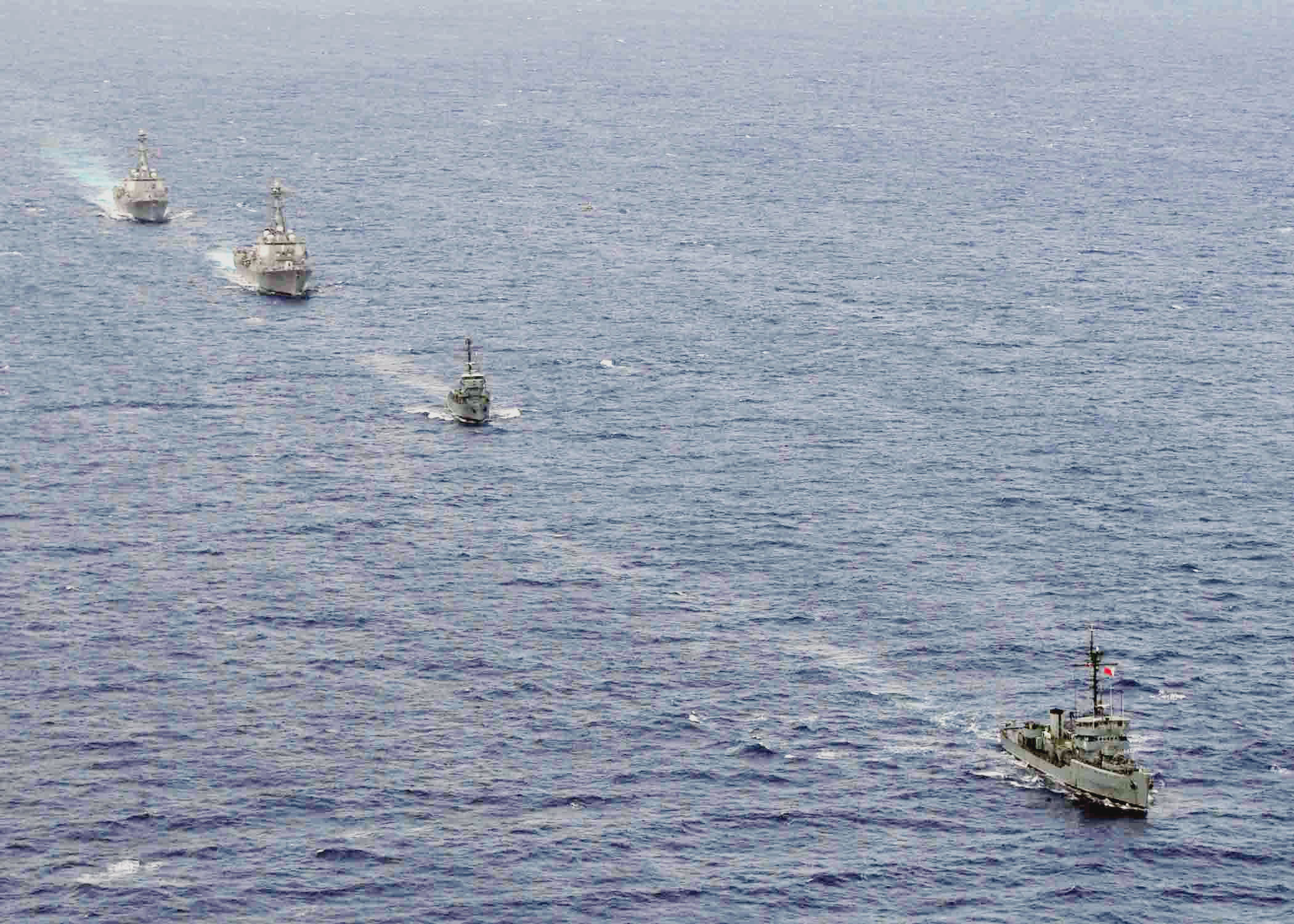
with BRP Rizal (PS-74), USS Chung-Hoon (DDG-93), and USS Howard (DDG-83) at CARAT Philippines 2011 exercise with the US Navy.

== See also ==
- List of decommissioned ships of the Philippine Navy
