= ROCS Yung Shun =

ROCS Yung Shun may refer to one of the following ships of the Republic of China Navy:

- ROCS Yung Shun (AM-44), the former American Admirable-class minesweeper USS Logic (AM-258)
- ROCS Yung Shun (MSF-46), the former American Admirable-class minesweeper USS Magnet (AM-260)
