= USS PCE-869 =

PCE-842-class of the US Navy

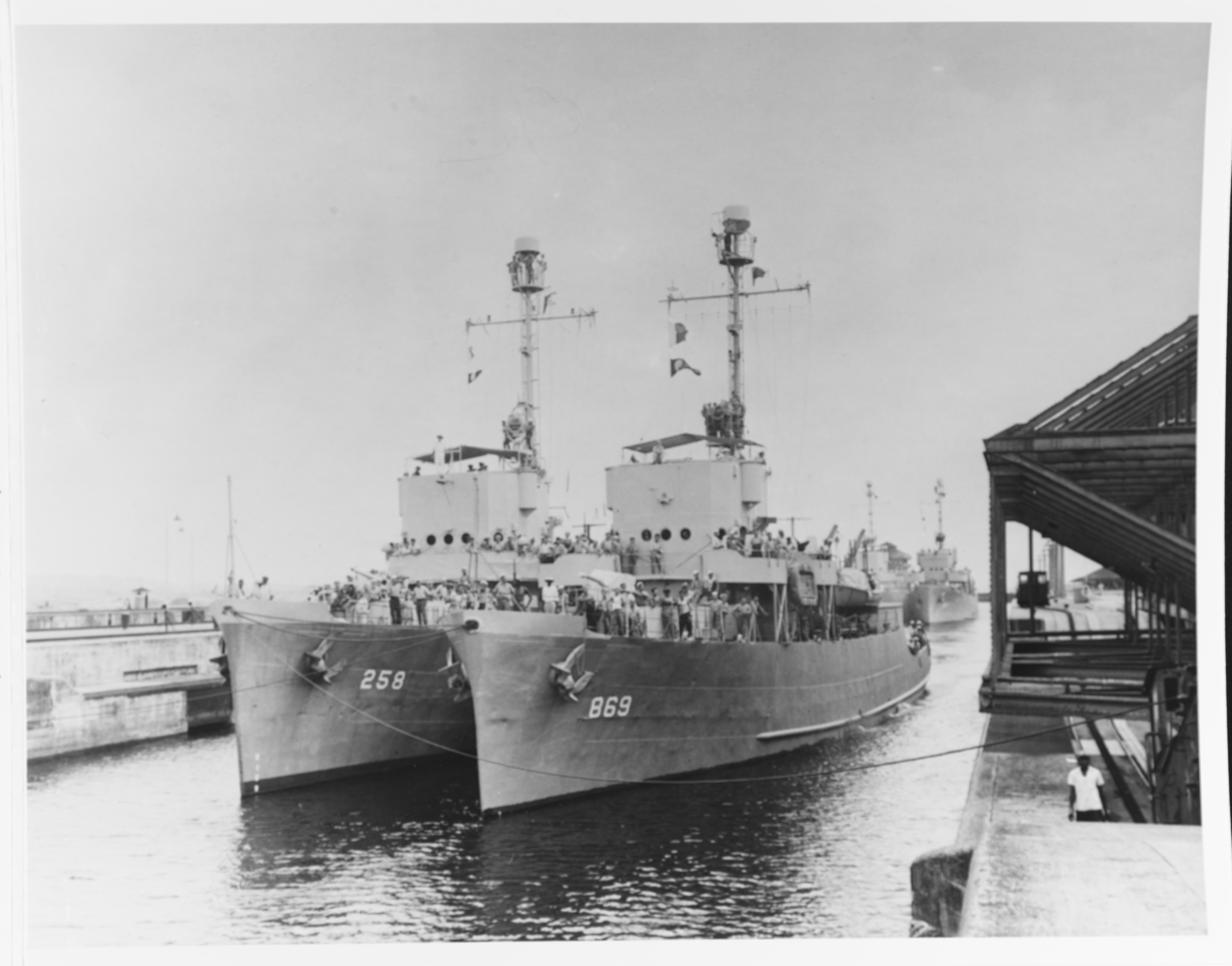
- ROCS Yung Shun and Yong Xing

History

United States
- Name: PCE-869
- Builder: Albina Engine & Machine Works, Portland
- Laid down: 2 September 1942
- Launched: 6 February 1943
- Commissioned: 19 September 1943
- Stricken: 1 July 1972
- Identification: Callsign: NZKN
- Fate: Transferred to Republic of China, 28 August 1945

History

Republic of China
- Name: Yong Xing; (永興)
- Namesake: Yongxing Island
- Acquired: 28 August 1945
- Decommissioned: 1 July 1971
- Renamed: Wei Yuan; (維源)
- Namesake: Lu Weiyuan
- Reclassified: PCE-68, 1949
- Identification: Pennant number: PCE-42
- Fate: Scrapped, 28 August 1971

General characteristics
- Class & type: PCE-842-class patrol craft
- Displacement: 914 Tons (Full Load)
- Length: 184.5 ft (56.2 m)
- Beam: 33 ft (10 m)
- Draft: 9.75 ft (2.97 m)
- Installed power: 2,200 hp (1,600 kW)
- Propulsion: Main: 2 × GM 12-278A diesel engines; Auxiliary: 2 × GM 6-71 diesel engines with 100KW gen and 1 × GM 3-268A diesel engine with 60KW gen
- Speed: 16 knots (30 km/h; 18 mph) (maximum),
- Range: 6,600 nmi (12,200 km; 7,600 mi) at 11 knots (20 km/h; 13 mph)
- Complement: 79
- Armament: 1 × Mk.26 3"/50 caliber gun dual purpose gun; 3 × single Bofors 40 mm gun; 4 × Mk.10 Oerlikon 20 mm guns; 4 × M2 .50 cal (12.7 mm) machine guns

USS PCE-869 was a PCE-842-class patrol craft for the United States Navy during World War II. She was renamed ROCS Yong Xing (PCE-42) and ROCS Wei Yuan (PCE-68) after being acquired by the Republic of China Navy on 28 August 1945.

== Construction and career ==
PCE-869 was laid down by Albina Engineer & Machine Works, Portland on 2 September 1942 and launched on 6 February 1943. She was commissioned on 19 September 1943.

After the war on 28 August 1945, she was transferred to the Republic of China Navy as ROCS Yong Xing (PCE-42). ROCS Yung Shun (AM-44) and Yong Xing passed through the Gatun locks, Panama Canal, on 21 April 1946, flying Chinese flags, but still wearing U.S. Navy hull numbers. Yongxing Island was the namesake of the ship.

In October 1946, Yong Xing was led by Lin Zun and Yao Ruyu, together with the Tai Ping, Chung Chien and Chung Yeh ships, to the South China Sea to receive and station in the Xisha and Nansha Islands. The ship was incorporated into the 1st Fleet of Coastal Defense, participated in the civil war, and successively shelled the liberated areas and bombed the 228 incident on the coasts of Shandong, Guangdong and other places, as well as major ports in Hainan Island and Taiwan.

Captain Lu Weiyuan commander of Yong Xing, a graduate of the Qingdao Maritime Academy, was a person trusted by the commander-in-chief of the Navy, Gui Yongqing. Lin Cheng, a staff member of the CPC Shanghai Bureau's Rebellion Committee, instigated Navigation Officer Chen Wanbang (the 12th Navigation Class of Mawei Sea School) and Quartermaster Zhu Jigang to lead them to organize medical officers, a sergeant, a marine corporal, two telecommunication soldiers, two or three gun and artillery soldiers were planning to join the Chinese Communist Party. At the end of April 1949, Yong Xing was ordered to set off from Wusongkou in Shanghai to patrol the Jiangyin area. On May 1, 1949, when sailing to Baimaosha outside the mouth of Shihe, Taicang County, Jiangsu Province, Chen Wanbang directed the insurgents to make a sudden action.

On September 1, 1949, to commemorate the death of the former captain, Lieutenant Colonel Lu Weiyuan, the ship was renamed as Wei Yuan, and the number was PCE-42 after the reorganization. In 1965, the Navy added the escort patrol ship and the minesweeper to different fleets, so the number was changed to PCE-68, decommissioned in 1971.

From March to May 1964, in order to build the airfield on Dongsha Island, the Navy's 62 task force composed the Wei Yuan, Mei Chen, and Mei Song 3 ships into the 62.9 task force, Wei Yuan as the flagship, and the logistics fleet commander Rear Admiral Qian Huaiyuan. He also serves as the detachment leader, implements the Tamjiang No. 2 Project, and transports materials for the construction of the airfield.
