= USS PCE-882 =

PCE-842-class of the US Navy

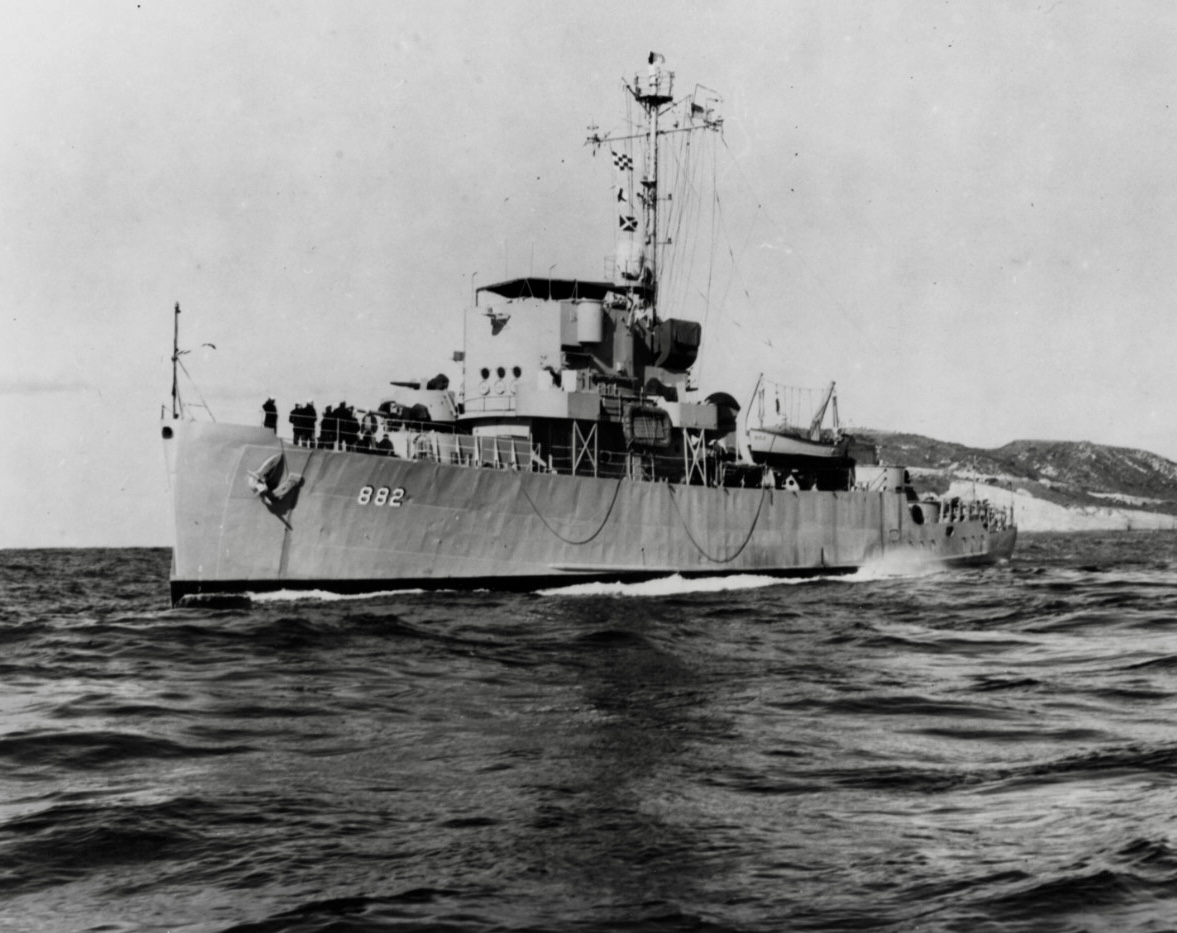
- USS PCE-882

History

United States
- Name: PCE-882
- Builder: Albina Engine & Machine Works, Portland
- Laid down: 26 August 1943
- Launched: 3 December 1943
- Commissioned: 23 February 1945
- Renamed: PCEC-882, 1942
- Stricken: 15 November 1974
- Identification: Callsign: NXMA
- Fate: Transferred to South Korea, 11 February 1955

History

South Korea
- Name: Noryang; (노량)
- Namesake: Battle of Noryang
- Acquired: 11 February 1955
- Decommissioned: 28 December 1977
- Identification: Pennant number: PCEC-51

General characteristics
- Class & type: PCE-842-class patrol craft
- Displacement: 914 Tons (Full Load)
- Length: 184.5 ft (56.2 m)
- Beam: 33 ft (10 m)
- Draft: 9.75 ft (2.97 m)
- Installed power: 2,200 hp (1,600 kW)
- Propulsion: Main: 2 × GM 12-278A diesel engines; Auxiliary: 2 × GM 6-71 diesel engines with 100KW gen and 1 × GM 3-268A diesel engine with 60KW gen
- Speed: 16 knots (30 km/h; 18 mph) (maximum),
- Range: 6,600 nmi (12,200 km; 7,600 mi) at 11 knots (20 km/h; 13 mph)
- Complement: 79
- Armament: 1 × Mk.26 3"/50 caliber gun dual purpose gun; 3 × single Bofors 40 mm gun; 4 × Mk.10 Oerlikon 20 mm guns; 4 × M2 .50 cal (12.7 mm) machine guns

USS PCE-882 was a PCE-842-class patrol craft for the United States Navy during World War II. She was renamed ROKS Noryang (PCEC-51) after being acquired by the Republic of Korea Navy on 11 February 1955.

== Construction and career ==
PCE-867 was laid down by Albina Engineer & Machine Works, Portland on 26 August 1943 and launched on 3 December 1943. She was commissioned on 23 February 1945. The ship was later renamed PCEC-882.

After the end of the Korean War, the Republic of Korea Navy acquired the ship and renamed it to ROKS Noryang (PCEC-51) on 11 February 1955.

In 1959, Noryang sank a spy ship within the waters of Soyeonpyeong. Near the coast of Samcheonpo in 1977, she participated in a counter-espionage operation.
