= USS Somersworth =

Patrol vessel of the United States Navy

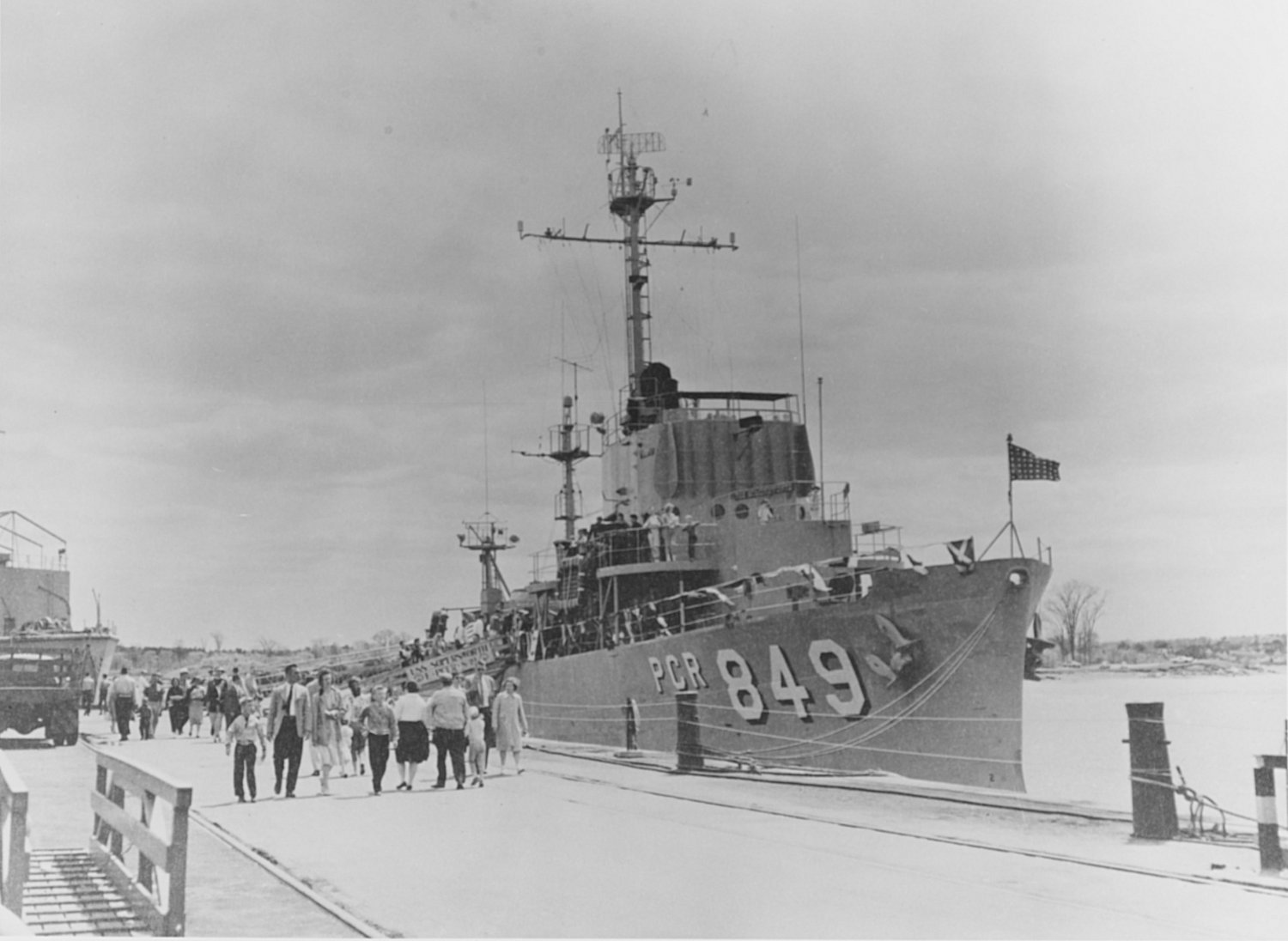
- USS Somersworth, c. 1960s

History

United States
- Name: USS Somersworth
- Namesake: Somersworth, New Hampshire
- Builder: Pullman-Standard Car Manufacturing Co., Chicago, Illinois
- Laid down: 24 September 1943
- Launched: 31 January 1944
- Sponsored by: Mrs. Frank G. Hammar
- Commissioned: 11 April 1944, as USS PCE(R)-849
- Decommissioned: September 1965
- Renamed: Somersworth, 15 February 1956
- Reclassified: EPCE(R)-850 (Experimental Patrol Craft Escort (Rescue)), 1959
- Stricken: 1 April 1966
- Home port: New London, CT (1946–1965)
- Fate: Sold; scrapped in 1972 at Portsmouth, Virginia

General characteristics
- Class & type: PCER-848 class armed rescue ship
- Displacement: 903 long tons (917 t)
- Length: 184 ft 6 in (56.24 m)
- Beam: 33 ft 1 in (10.08 m)
- Draft: 9 ft 5 in (2.87 m)
- Propulsion: 2 × 900 bhp (671 kW) General Motors 12-567A diesel engines; Falk single reduction gear; 2 shafts
- Speed: 15.7 knots (29.1 km/h; 18.1 mph)
- Complement: 99 officers and enlisted
- Armament: 1 × 3"/50 caliber guns; 2 × 40 mm AA guns; 2 × Depth charge tracks; 2 × Depth charge projectors

USS Somersworth (PCE(R)-849) was a United States Navy PCE(R)-848-class Patrol Craft Escort (Rescue), in commission from April 1944 to September 1965. The ship was named after the city of Somersworth, New Hampshire.

== Role ==
Each ship of the PCER-848 class was an armed rescue ship built on the hull of the PCE (Patrol Craft Escort) by the Pullman-Standard Car Manufacturing Company in Chicago, Illinois. The ships were to serve three missions: damage control / firefighting; casualty treatment / evacuation; and patrol / guardship. Each ship's hospital contained 65 beds, with a surgical suite, and X-ray facilities. The medical department consisted of a staff of 11 doctors and hospital corpsmen.

Three ships of the class—PCER-848, -849 and -850—were refitted and their hospital spaces converted into communications centers to support the US Army's activities in the Pacific Theater.

== Service history ==
The ship was laid down on 24 September 1943 by the Pullman-Standard Car Manufacturing Company of Chicago, launched on 31 January 1944, and commissioned as USS PCE(R)-849 on 11 April 1944. The ship was at the Battle of Leyte Gulf in October 1944. It was also present at the surrender of Japan in Tokyo Bay on 2 September 1945, and was the first American ship to dock post-war at the Port of Tokyo. The ship received three battle stars for service during World War II.

From 1946 to 1965, the ship was stationed at New London, Connecticut, at the Naval Underwater Sound Laboratory. The ship was named USS Somersworth on 15 February 1956.

On 17 July 1957, three crew members were killed and eight were injured (four seriously) by an explosion when the ship was approximately 90 miles (140 km) southeast of Montauk, New York. The blast was attributed to the premature detonation of explosives used for underwater sound tests. The four seriously injured crew members were transferred to the nearby RMS Queen Mary, which was en route from New York City to England, and later transported to Newport, Rhode Island, by the USS Sunbird. One injured seaman had to have his left leg amputated. The Navy later issued dereliction of duty letters to the ship's commander and gunnery officer.

In 1959, the ship was reclassified as EPCE(R)-849, an Experimental Patrol Craft Escort (Rescue). The ship was decommissioned in September 1965 and was struck from the naval register on 1 April 1966. It was later sold, and then scrapped in 1972 at Portsmouth, Virginia.

== Legacy ==
USS Somersworth Park is located in the city that the ship was named for—Somersworth, New Hampshire—at the intersection of Main Street and Market Street. A memorial to crew members who served on the ship is located in Stein Park on Main Street.

On July 17, 2004, a reunion of 32 personnel who had served on the ship, including four former captains, was held in Somersworth.

== See also ==
- USS Fairview PCE(R)-850
