= BRP Iloilo =

Philippine Navy corvette

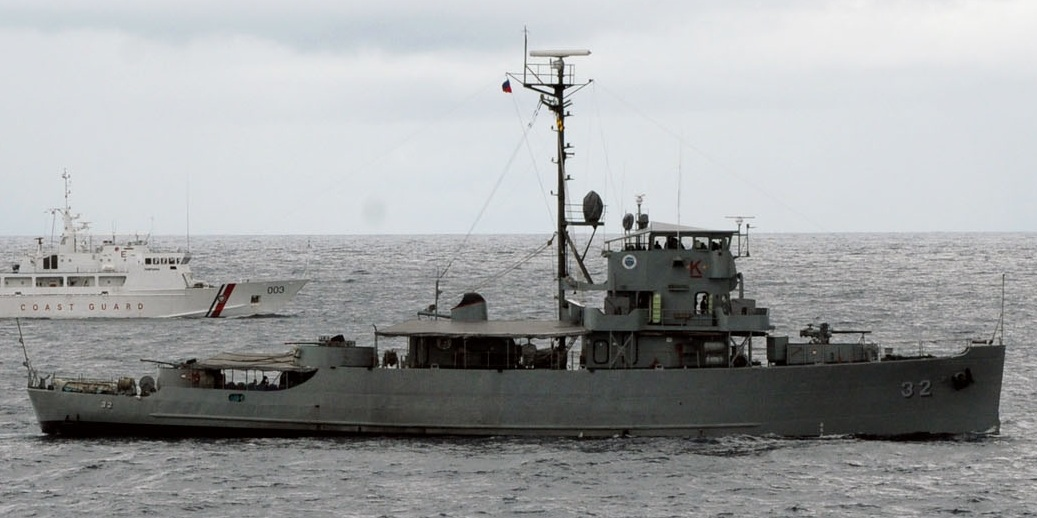
- BRP Iloilo (PS-32) at CARAT 2012-Philippines

History

United States
- Name: PCE-897
- Builder: Willamette Iron and Steel Works, Portland, Oregon
- Laid down: 16 December 1942
- Launched: 3 August 1943
- Commissioned: 6 January 1945
- Fate: transferred to the Philippine Navy, July 1948

History

Philippines
- Name: Iloilo
- Namesake: Iloilo is one of the provinces in the Visayas, Philippines.
- Acquired: 2 July 1948
- Commissioned: 2 July 1948
- Decommissioned: September 2016
- Renamed: RPS Iloilo (PS-32) 1965-1966 BRP Iloilo (PS-32), June 1980
- Status: Decommissioned, awaiting disposal

General characteristics
- Class & type: PCE-842-class patrol craft (in U.S. Navy service)
- Class & type: Miguel Malvar-class corvette (in Philippine Navy service)
- Displacement: 914 Tons (Full Load)
- Length: 184.5 ft (56.2 m)
- Beam: 33 ft (10 m)
- Draft: 9.75 ft (2.97 m)
- Propulsion: Main: 2 × GM 12-278A diesel engines; Auxiliary: 2 × GM 6-71 diesel engines with 100KW gen and 1 × GM 3-268A diesel engine with 60KW gen
- Speed: 16 knots (30 km/h; 18 mph) (maximum),
- Range: 6,600 nmi (12,200 km; 7,600 mi) at 11 knots (20 km/h; 13 mph)
- Complement: 85
- Sensors & processing systems: Raytheon AN/SPS-64(V)11 Surface Search / Navigation Radar
- Armament: 1 × Mk.26 3"/50-caliber gun dual-purpose gun; 3 × twin Mk.1 Bofors 40 mm gun; 4 × Mk.10 Oerlikon 20 mm guns; 4 × M2 .50 cal (12.7 mm) machine guns

BRP Iloilo (PS-32) was a Miguel Malvar-class corvette of the Philippine Navy. She was originally built as USS PCE-897, a PCE-842-class patrol craft for the United States Navy during World War II. She was decommissioned from the U.S. Navy and transferred to the Philippine Navy in July 1948 and renamed RPS Iloilo (E-32) after the Philippine province of the same name. Along with other World War II-era ships of the Philippine Navy, Iloilo was considered one of the oldest active fighting ships in the world, being in continuous service for over seven decades.

== History ==
Commissioned in the US Navy as USS PCE-897 in 1945, and was decommissioned after World War II.

She was then transferred and commissioned into the Philippine Naval Patrol and was renamed RPS Iloilo (E-32) in July 1948. She was carried on to the Philippine Navy in 1950, and between 1965 and 1966 she was renamed as RPS Iloilo (PS-32) using a new classification system. Again in June 1980 she was renamed BRP Iloilo (PS-32) using a new localized prefix.

Between 1990 and 1991 the Iloilo underwent major overhaul, weapons and radar systems refit, and upgrade of communications gear.

She was assigned with the Patrol Force of the Philippine Fleet and was decommissioned from the service in September 2016.

== Notable Operations ==
In January 1973, RPS Iloilo gave naval gunfire support to Army and Scout Ranger teams at Sibalo Hill, Jolo when the rebel forces tried to retake this strategic place which had been captured by the Marines in 1972.

On July 7, 1973, Iloilo, as part of Task Force 32 Naval Gunfire Support Group under the command of Cdr. Vicente Escala (PN), provided pre-assault bombardment in support of Landing Force 33 during Operation "Pamukpok" against the insurgent group in Tuburan, Basilan led by Huden Abubakar Aka Juden Salikala.

The next day, RPS Iloilo delivered sustained and accurate naval gunfire on Canas Island, Basilan and succeeded in extricating pinned down ground troops.

In November 1973, RPS Iloilo delivered gunfire support for groun troops and also conducted naval mopping-up operations in Tawi-Tawi. In assaulting rebel forces in Karungdong, the ship's 3"50, 40-MM, and 20MM guns destroyed the rebel's machinegun nest located at a schoolhouse and a mosque. The enemy's .50-caliber machinegun fire found their marks in several parts of the ship.

In December 2009, Iloilo and BRP Alberto Navarette (PG-394) conducted sea surface search and rescue operations for any survivors on the sinking of MB Baleno 9.

From 2 April to 17 April 2011, the Iloilo, acting as an escort vessel for BRP Dagupan City (LC-551) conducted a joint logistics run (LOG Run) and Southern Cruise for PMA Batch 2014.

== Technical details ==
There are slight difference between the BRP Pangasinan as compared to some of her sister ships in the Philippine Navy, since her previous configuration was as a patrol craft escort (PCE), while the others are configured as rescue patrol craft escort (PCER) and minesweepers (Admirable-class) ships.

=== Armaments ===
Originally the ship was armed with one forward Mk.26 3"/50-caliber dual-purpose gun, three aft twin Mk.1 Bofors 40 mm guns, four Mk.10 20 mm Oerlikon guns, 1 Hedgehog depth charge projector, four depth charge projectiles (K-guns) and two depth charge tracks. This configuration applies before its overhaul in the early 1990s.

During its overhaul and refit between 1990 and 1991, the Philippine Navy removed her old anti-submarine weapons and systems, and made some changes in the armament set-up. Some sources claim the loss of its three Bofors 40mm cannons during the 1990-1991 overhaul and refit period, but photos from 2011 show the Bofors guns still present, although in singles instead of twins. Final armaments fitted to the ship are one Mk.26 3"/50-caliber gun (fore), three single Bofors 40 mm cannons (aft), four Mk.10 Oerlikon 20 mm cannons (2 each on bridge wings), and four M2 Browning .50 cal (12.7 mm) caliber machine guns (2 besides main bridge, 2 at near the lower Bofors gun tub). This made the ship lighter and ideal for surface patrols, but losing her limited anti-submarine warfare capability.

=== Electronics ===
Also during the refit the ship's RCA CRM-NIA-75 surface search radar and RCA SPN-18 navigation radar was replaced by a Raytheon AN/SPS-64(V)11 surface search and navigation radar system. Later modifications included the installation of long range and satellite communications systems, and GPS system standard to all Philippine Navy ships.

=== Machinery ===
The ship is powered by two GM 12-278A diesel engines, with a combined rating of around 2,200 bhp (1,600 kW) driving two propellers. The main engines can propel the 914 tons (full load) ship to a maximum speed of around 16 knots (30 km/h).

== Gallery ==
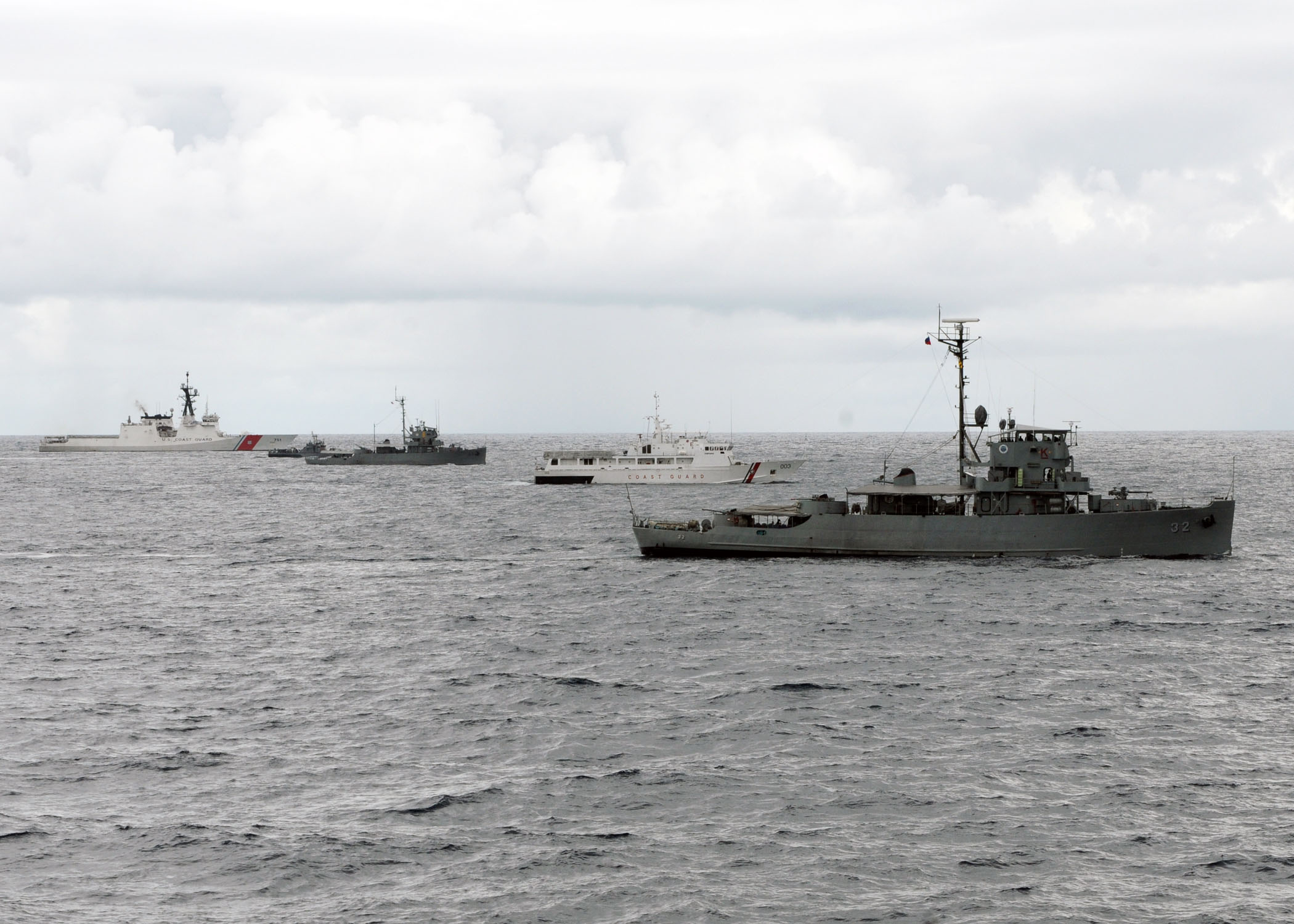
BRP Iloilo (PS-32), BRP Pampanga (SARV-003), BRP Miguel Malvar (PS-19), BRP Salvador Abcede (PG-114) and USCGC Waesche (WMSL-751) join USS Vandegrift (FFG-48) for a photo exercise (PHOTOEX) during CARAT 2012-Philippines

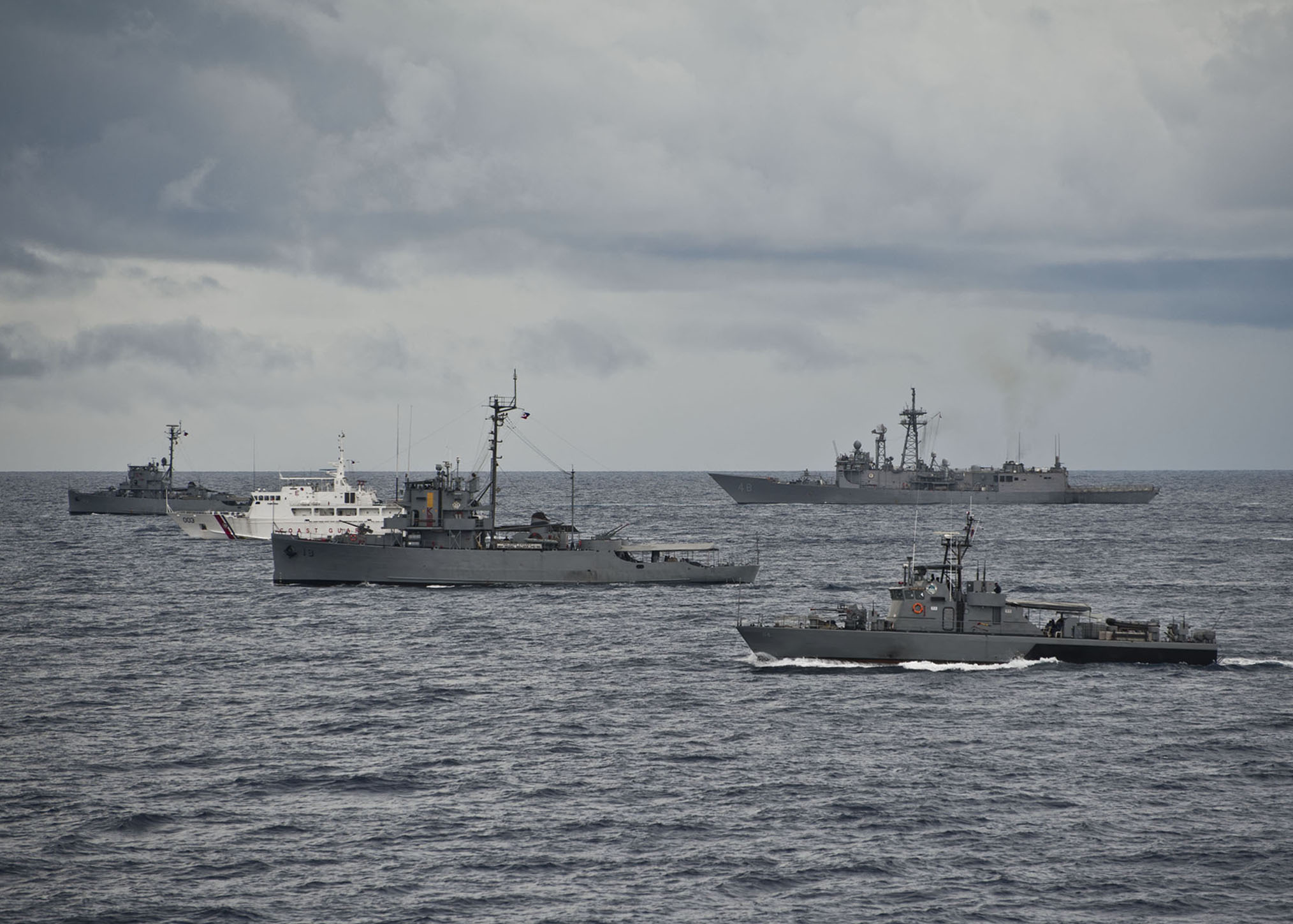
BRP Salvador Abcede (PG-114), BRP Miguel Malvar (PS-19), BRP Iloilo (PS-32), BRP Pampanga (SARV-003), and USS Vandegrift (FFG-48) for a photo exercise (PHOTOEX) during CARAT 2012-Philippines
