= USS PCE-872 =

PCE-842-class of the US Navy

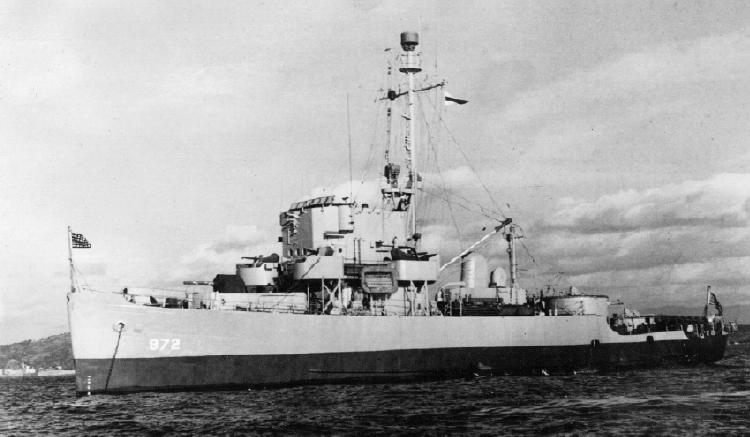
- PCE-872

History

United States
- Name: PCE-872
- Builder: Albina Engine & Machine Works, Portland
- Laid down: 30 January 1943
- Launched: 24 March 1943
- Commissioned: 29 November 1943
- Reclassified: PCEC-872
- Fate: Transferred to Cuban Navy, 1 October 1947

History

Cuba
- Name: Caribe
- Acquired: 1 October 1947
- Reclassified: PE 201
- Identification: Pennant number: H 201
- Fate: Unknown

General characteristics
- Class & type: PCE-842-class patrol craft
- Displacement: 914 Tons (Full Load)
- Length: 184.5 ft (56.2 m)
- Beam: 33 ft (10 m)
- Draft: 9.75 ft (2.97 m)
- Installed power: 2,200 hp (1,600 kW)
- Propulsion: Main: 2 × GM 12-278A diesel engines; Auxiliary: 2 × GM 6-71 diesel engines with 100KW gen and 1 × GM 3-268A diesel engine with 60KW gen
- Speed: 16 knots (30 km/h; 18 mph) (maximum),
- Range: 6,600 nmi (12,200 km; 7,600 mi) at 11 knots (20 km/h; 13 mph)
- Complement: 79
- Armament: 1 × Mk.26 3"/50 caliber gun dual purpose gun; 3 × single Bofors 40 mm gun; 4 × Mk.10 Oerlikon 20 mm guns; 4 × M2 .50 cal (12.7 mm) machine guns

USS PCE-872 was a PCE-842-class patrol craft for the United States Navy during World War II. She was renamed Caribe (H 201) after being acquired by the Cuban Navy on 1 October 1947.

== History ==
PCE-872 was laid down by Albina Engineer & Machine Works, Portland on 30 January 1943 and launched on 24 March 1943. She was commissioned on 29 November 1943.

On 24 July 1945, her alongside USS PC-803 and USS PC-804 scuttled the stricken destroyer escort USS Underhill after being hit by a kaiten launched torpedo from I-53. On 20 August of the same year, she was reclassified to PCEC-872.

After the war, she was transferred to the Foreign Liquidation Commission and later sold to Cuba and renamed Caribe (H 201) in the early 1950s. She was reclassified to (PE 201).

== Bibliography ==
- Silverstone, Paul H. (2008). The Navy of World War II, 1922-1947. The U.S. Navy Warship Series. New York: Routledge. ISBN 978-0-415-97898-9.
