= MS Sunnhordland =

Patrol vessel of the United States Navy

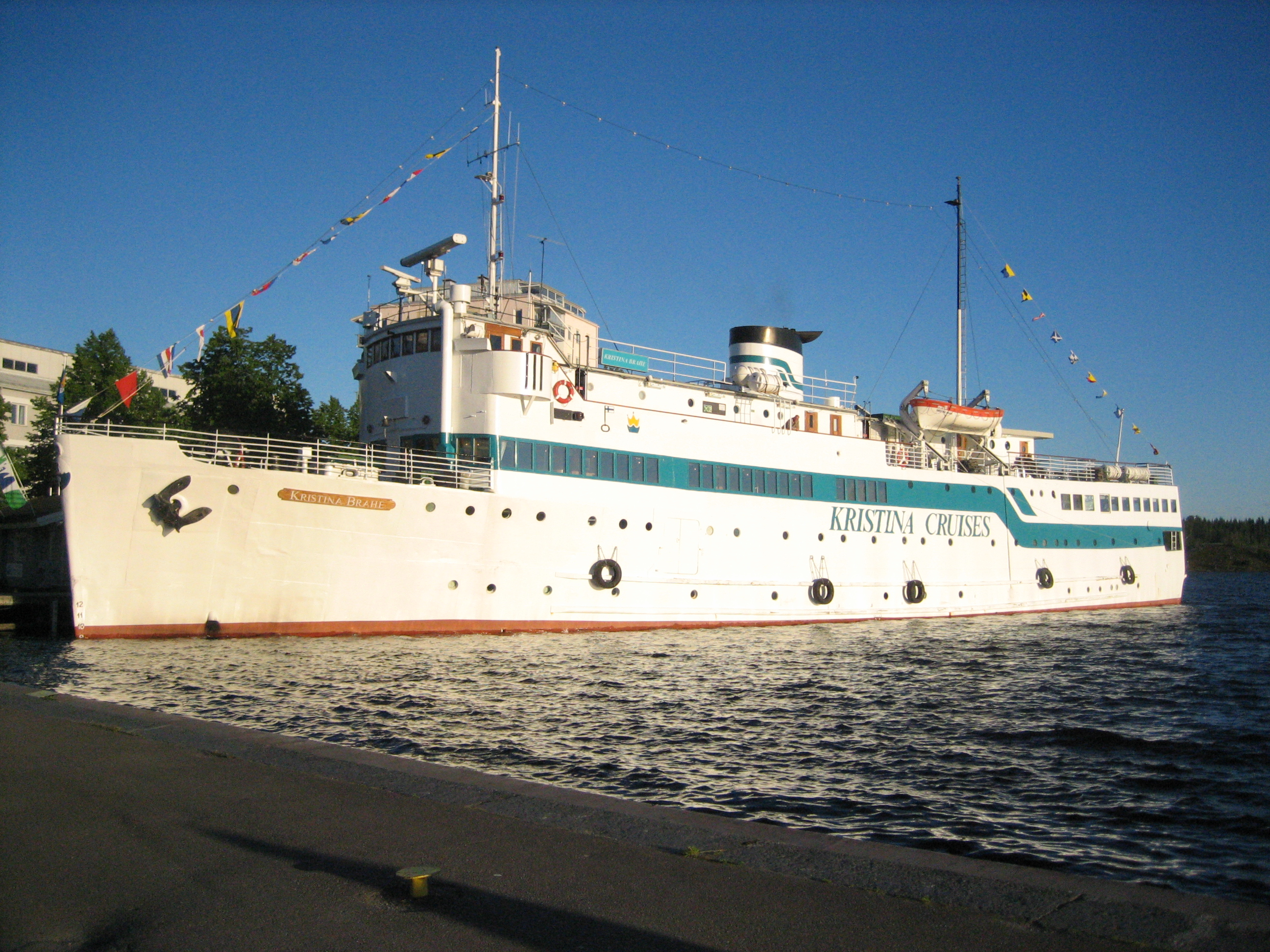
- Kristina Brahe in her civilian state in Savonlinna, 2008.

History

United Kingdom
- Name: Kilchrenan
- Builder: Pullman-Standard Car Company, Chicago, Illinois
- Laid down: 24 December 1942
- Launched: 13 June 1943
- Commissioned: 31 August 1943
- Stricken: 1947
- Identification: IMO number: 5345065; MMSI number: 259167000; Callsign: LEJP
- Fate: Returned to U.S. Navy custody, December 1946; Sold to Norway, 1947
- Status: in active service, as of 2010

General characteristics as PCE
- Class & type: PCE-842-class patrol craft
- Displacement: 640 long tons (650 t)
- Length: 180 ft 6 in (55.02 m)
- Beam: 33 ft (10 m)
- Draft: 9 ft 8 in (2.95 m)
- Propulsion: 2 × 1,800 bhp (1,342 kW) General Motors 12-567A diesel engines; Falk single reduction gear; 2 shafts
- Speed: 15 knots (28 km/h; 17 mph)
- Complement: 100
- Armament: 1 × 3"/50 caliber gun; 3 × 40 mm guns; 5 × 20 mm guns; 2 × Depth charge tracks; 4 × Depth charge projectors; 2 × Hedgehog anti-submarine mortars

General characteristics as cruise ship
- Tonnage: 1,105 gross register tons (GRT)
- Length: 56.8 m (186 ft 4 in)
- Beam: 10.08 m (33 ft 1 in)
- Draft: 3.3 m (10 ft 10 in)
- Decks: 4
- Propulsion: 2 × Caterpillar, 1,275 kW (1,710 hp)
- Speed: 12 knots (22 km/h; 14 mph) cruising; 14 kn (26 km/h; 16 mph) maximum
- Capacity: 45 passenger cabins
- Crew: 18

USS PCE-830 was a U.S.-built Patrol Craft Escort (PCE) vessel launched on 13 June 1943 by the Pullman-Standard Car Company of Chicago, Illinois. It was transferred to the Royal Navy and given the name HMS Kilchrenan in August 1943. As of 2020 it operates as the cruise ship MS Sunnhordland in Norway.

== Service history ==
=== World War II, 1943–1946 ===
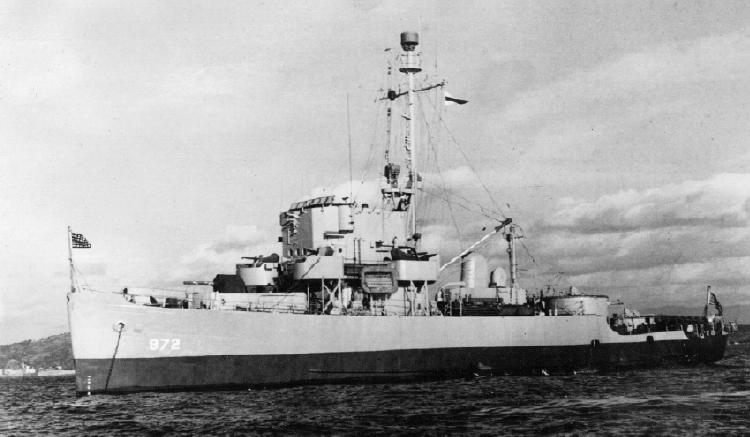
A sister-ship, PCE-872

Kilchrenan spent the Second World War based at Gibraltar patrolling west Africa and taking part in convoys. Returned to U.S. Navy custody in December 1946, she was struck from the Naval Vessel Register in 1947.

=== In commercial service, 1947–present ===
She was purchased by Norwegian Hardanger Sunnhordlandske Dampskipsselskap (HSD) in 1947, rebuilt as a passenger ship and given the name Sunnhordland. She ran for several years in western Norway.

The ship was sold to Finland in 1974 as Kristina Brahe and until 2010 operated as a passenger ship by Kristina Cruises of Kotka, Finland, making short cruises in the Baltic Sea and Lake Saimaa. The Kristina Brahe was sold to Saimaan Matkaverkko Ltd in August 2010. Her name was shortened to simply Brahe. In 2015 she was sold again, and brought back to western Norway where she operates as a cruise ship. Her name was changed back to Sundhordland.

== See also ==
- List of cruise ships
- List of patrol vessels of the United States Navy
