= USS PCE-893 =

PCE-842-class of the US Navy

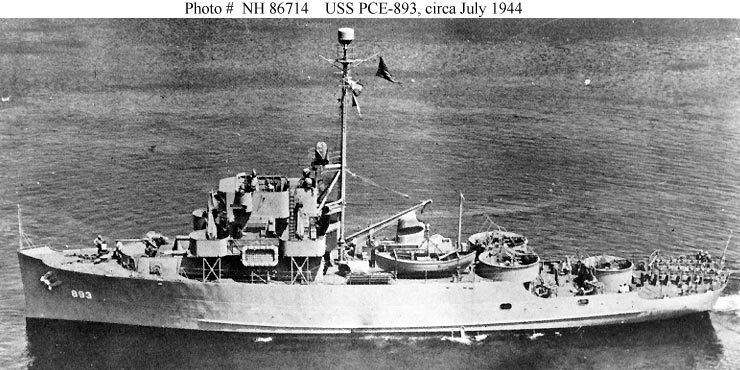
- USS PCE-893

History

United States
- Name: PCE-893
- Builder: Willamette Iron and Steel Works, Portland
- Laid down: 27 October 1942
- Launched: 8 May 1943
- Commissioned: 25 July 1944
- Reclassified: PCEC-893
- Fate: Transferred to Cuban Navy, 20 November 1947

History

Cuba
- Name: Siboney
- Namesake: Siboney
- Acquired: 20 November 1947
- Reclassified: PE 202
- Identification: Pennant number: H 101
- Fate: Unknown

General characteristics
- Class & type: PCE-842-class patrol craft
- Displacement: 914 Tons (Full Load)
- Length: 184.5 ft (56.2 m)
- Beam: 33 ft (10 m)
- Draft: 9.75 ft (2.97 m)
- Installed power: 2,200 hp (1,600 kW)
- Propulsion: Main: 2 × GM 12-278A diesel engines; Auxiliary: 2 × GM 6-71 diesel engines with 100KW gen and 1 × GM 3-268A diesel engine with 60KW gen
- Speed: 16 knots (30 km/h; 18 mph) (maximum),
- Range: 6,600 nmi (12,200 km; 7,600 mi) at 11 knots (20 km/h; 13 mph)
- Complement: 79
- Armament: 1 × Mk.26 3"/50 caliber gun dual purpose gun; 3 × single Bofors 40 mm gun; 4 × Mk.10 Oerlikon 20 mm guns; 4 × M2 .50 cal (12.7 mm) machine guns

USS PCE-893 was a PCE-842-class patrol craft for the United States Navy during World War II. She was renamed Siboney (H 101) after being acquired by the Cuban Navy on 20 November 1947.

== History ==
PCE-893 was laid down by Willamette Iron and Steel Works, Portland on 27 October 1942 and launched on 8 May 1943. She was commissioned on 25 July 1944 and assigned to the west coast.

In September 1945, she was assigned to the Philippine Sea Frontier for monitoring weather and planes.

From mid-1947, she was homeported in New Orleans.

After the war, she was transferred to the Foreign Liquidation Commission and later sold to Cuba and renamed Siboney (H 101) in the early 1950s. She was reclassified to (PE 202).
