= USS Havre =

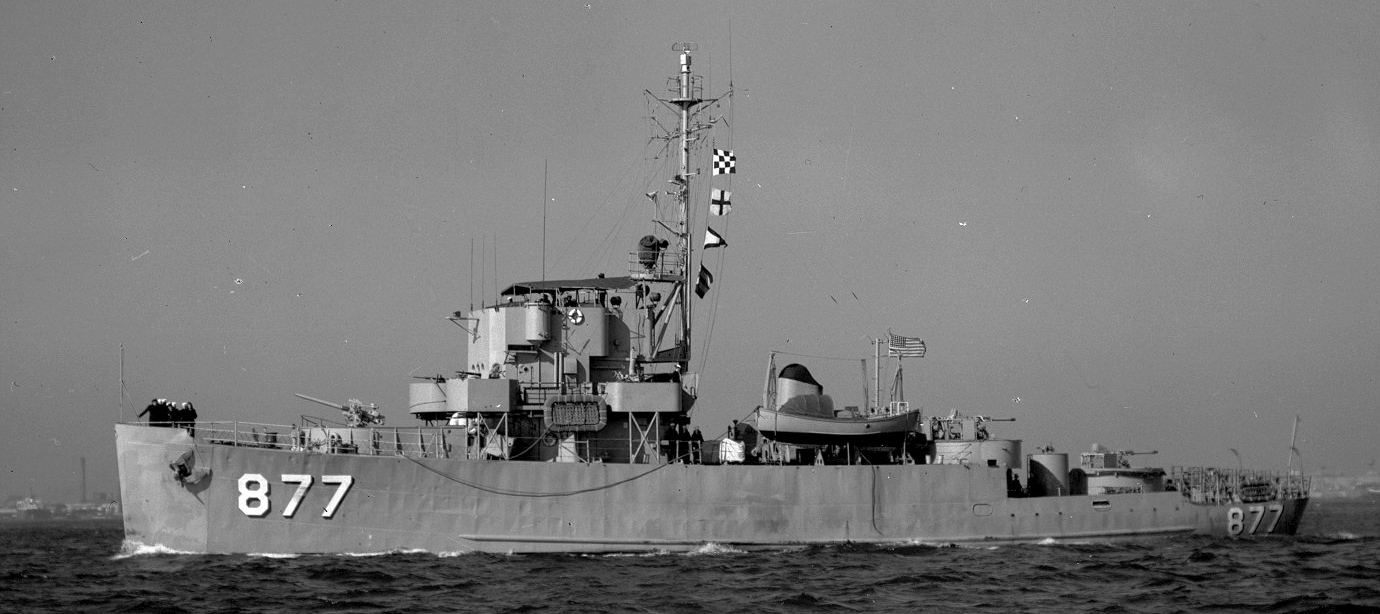
- PCEC-877 in 1946

History

United States
- Name: Havre
- Namesake: Havre, Montana
- Builder: Albina, Portland Willamette Iron & Steel
- Laid down: 6 May 1943, as PCE-877
- Launched: 11 August 1943
- Commissioned: 14 February 1944
- Decommissioned: 1 July 1970
- Renamed: Havre, 15 February 1956
- Reclassified: PCE(C)-877 (Patrol Craft Escort - Control), 20 August 1945; PCE-877 (Patrol Craft Escort), 27 October 1955
- Stricken: 1 July 1970

General characteristics
- Class & type: PCE-842-class patrol craft
- Displacement: 903 tons
- Length: 184 ft 6 in (56.24 m)
- Beam: 33 ft 1 in (10.08 m)
- Draft: 9 ft 5 in (2.87 m)
- Propulsion: Two 900 bhp (670 kW) General Motors 12-567A diesel engines; Falk single reduction gear; 2 shafts
- Speed: 15.7 knots (29.1 km/h; 18.1 mph)
- Complement: 99
- Armament: 1 3"/50 dual purpose gun mount; 3 twin 40mm gun mounts; 5 20mm mounts; 4 depth charge projectors; 1 depth charge projector (Hedgehog); 2 depth charge tracks

Service record
- Operations: World War II
- Awards: 2 battle stars as PCE-877

USS Havre (PCE(C)-877) was a United States Navy PCE-842-class patrol craft escort in commission from 14 February 1944 to 1 July 1970. She served in the Central Pacific during World War II, supporting invasions of Battle of Iwo Jima and the Battle of Okinawa, and was present in Tokyo Bay for the formal Surrender of Japan on 2 September 1945. Unlike other ships from this class, which were scrapped or sold to other nations, the vessel stayed the property of the United States Navy, which transferred ownership to the United States Navy Reserve as Naval Reserve Training Ship for 9th Naval District (Chicago) in April 1954. She was renamed Havre (PCE-877) on 15 February 1956 as part of a Navy-wide initiative to provide names to all numbered ships. Havre served on the Great Lakes until struck from Navy List on 1 July 1970.

== Construction and commissioning ==
Havre was laid down on 6 May 1943 at Albina Engine & Machine Works, Portland, Oregon, as Patrol Craft Escort, PCE-877. The PCEs were designed for general escort work and provided a cheaper and quicker alternative to the larger destroyers, while maintaining a substantial amount of detection and ranging gear used for locating submarines. The ship was launched on 11 August 1943. The launching of the PCE 877 was a celebrated occasion that was noted in the 10 August 1943 edition of the Corvallis Gazette-Times of Corvallis, Oregon. On 11 August 1943, Marjorie L. Wooton, daughter of local Colonel Elmer V. Wooton, recent recipient of the Distinguished Service Medal (U.S. Army), christened the PCE 877 in the presence of a crowd that included Oregon governor Earl Snell.

PCE-877 was commissioned on 14 February 1944 at the Albina Engine & Machine Works shipyard, Portland, Oregon. According to the U.S. Navy Muster Rolls, PCE-877 set out with Commanding Officer Coleman H. Smith, Lieutenant, USNR, Executive Officer John R. Shea Jr., Lieutenant, USNR, several additional officers and an initial crew of 87. The vessel received its fitting out and shakedown over the next six weeks, departing Portland, Oregon on 25 February 1944, docking in Astoria, Oregon on 26 February 1944, arriving in San Pedro, California (SCTC Terminal Island) on 6 March 1944, before finally arriving at Naval Base San Diego, California on 21 March 1944.

== Service history ==
=== World War II Pacific Theatre operations ===
==== Initial Deployment, Conversion to Control Vessel ====
Starting 1 April 1944, PCE-877 began its escort duties as Patrol and Escort, Central Pacific region, while still based at Naval Base San Diego. At 1200 hours on 11 September 1944, PCE-877 officially was underway to Naval Station Pearl Harbor as part of Task Unit 116.1.2. The ship proceeded to the northern part of San Clemente Island, California where the crew "ran a measured mile to check the accuracy and adjust our newly installed DRT (Dead Reckoning Tracer)."

At 1030 hours 19 September 1944, PCE-877 arrived at Naval Station Pearl Harbor, Hawaii for conversion to a Central Control Vessel for Amphibious Force. The Navy control groups were responsible for the control of the assault waves of landing ships, landing craft, and amphibious vehicles from the transport and landing ship areas to the landing beaches. From 20 September 1944 to 3 November 1944 the ship was docked at D.E. Dock #1 Pearl Harbor for the installation of radio and communications equipment. During this period, the crew "conducted various exercises and tests throughout month. All gun crews attended AA schools. Damage Control parties attended fire fighting school. AS/W attack team spent one day operating with tame submerging and attended attack teacher a total of 8 hours."

Refitting was completed on 2 December 1944, and for six days PCE-877 acted as Officer in tactical command (OTC) for a training group of control vessels between Pearl Harbor and Waianae, Hawaii. A second series of drills and exercises starting 18 December 1944 running nine days saw PCE-877 acting as an Escort Commander for screening and as a Line of Departure Control Vessel in simulated landing operations.

On 14 December 1944, Lieutenant Coleman H. Smith, USNR, was relieved as Commanding Officer of PCE-877 by Lieutenant John R. Shea Jr., USNR. Lieutenant James B. Brady, USNR was promoted to Executive Officer. (Lt. Smith would advance to the rank of Commander, and after the war was a long-serving director of the War Gaming Department at the US Naval War College in Newport, Rhode Island.)

PCE-877 participated in several additional exercises on 3 January 1945 (three days) and 11 January 1945 (eight days) as part of Administrative Command Amphibious Forces, US Pacific Fleet. The ship was ordered to move to mooring Easy 7 at Pearl Harbor for logistics and supply.

==== Battle of Iwo Jima ====
On 22 January 1945, PCE-877 departed Pearl Harbor as part of Task Force 51, Joint Expeditionary Force, Commander Amphibious Forces Pacific 53.3, conducting screening operations for Tractor Group BAKER en route to Eniwetok Atoll in the Marshall Islands, arriving 3 February 1945. After two days of logistics and resupply, Tractor Group BAKER continued on to Saipan, the largest island of the Northern Mariana Islands, with PCE-877 continuing patrol and screening operations. The group arrived in Saipan Harbor the morning of 10 February 1945.

Starting 12 February 1945, the PCE 877 continued as Central Control Vessel as part of nighttime landing exercises. There was difficulty in re-embarking the LVTs (Landing Vehicle Tracked), as their parent LST (Landing Ship Tank) had moved to a sheltered position, and PCE-877 "acted as a guide to round up stray LVTs and help them to their mother ship."

After completing logistical operations in Saipan Harbor, PCE-877 shipped out at 1350 hours on 15 February 1945, proceeding as part of TU 51.13.6, performing screening operations for Tractor Group BAKER, en route to Iwo Jima, Volcano Islands, to join the invasion force. On 18 February 1945, PCE-877 encountered a radar contact at 2,000 yards, readied for a depth charge attack, but "at 300 yards it became apparent that our contact was [a school of] large fish."

At 0540 of 19 February 1945, PCE-877 secured from screening operations and proceeded independently to assume duties as Central Control Vessel. Once at the transport area, the ship began dispatching waves of landing craft on schedule. All assault waves were dispatched on schedule, and the ship maintained station for the entire day, except when on standby as rescue vessel for the U.S.S. LSM 211 (Landing Ship Medium) - (see List of United States Navy Landing Ship Medium (LSMs)), which had been damaged by mortar fire. PCE-877 was under fire several times, but received no hits. PCE-877 stayed on station until 21 February 1945, then left station and conducted rescue and salvage operations, aiding stray and sinking LVTs and LCVP (United States). Rough seas caused several craft to drift seaward. "One LVT was stripped of salvageable items and sunk by gunfire from this vessel." This LVT eventually collided with PCE-877's starboard propeller while tied alongside, causing slight damage.

On 22 February 1945, the ship conducted patrols in the area, and two days later joined TU 51.2 for screening duties as the convoy left the operations area en route to Leyte, Philippines by way of Saipan. On 2 March 1945, PCE-877 anchored in the outer harbor of Saipan and proceeded with logistics, but was not able to complete refueling in the short time allowed for the group, and continued underway on 3 March 1945. At 1630 on 9 March 1945 PCE-877 anchored off Dulag, Leyte. Starting 10 March 1945, the ship took aboard stores and provisions and made repairs on sound gear (due to a transformer failure) and on the starboard screw. The damage to the propeller caused "excessive vibrations which had been present at speeds between 11 and 14 knots." Starting 15 March 1945, PCE-877 acted as the central control vessel directing practice landings on Leyte, while completing the sonar and propeller repairs over ten days.

==== Battle of Okinawa ====
On 24 March 1945 PCE-877 departed Leyte Bay with ComLST Flotilla 21 en route for Okinawa. The fleet encountered six days of increasing high seas (categorized as "high" with up to 30 foot waves on the Douglas sea scale and winds topping 55 knots). The storm ended on 31 March 1945, and the fleet arrived on 1 April 1945 to waters off Okinawa Island.

PCE-877 was detached from screening duties and proceeded to attack station, which was assumed on schedule. "Enemy aircraft caused interference for a short period of time during approach to station, but the principal cause of concern was the closeness of our own ship's anti-aircraft fire.". The ship went on night retirement with units of Tractor Group "Dog", and was able to refuel on 2 April 1945. Working again at night that evening with Tractor Group "Dog", an "error in navigation led the group into dangerous water on the west side of Mae Shima [sic - Maejima] and this ship left screening station to keep clear of the reefs.". Later that morning at 0118 3 April 1945 a mine-like object was sighted and sunk by small arms fire from PCE-877. The ship continued on night work for several days, and managed to avoid "suicide planes" that attacked ships in the transport area. "Friendly ships fired and shot down three FMs Mitsubishi F1M over land in the vicinity of the airstrip east of Purple Beach."

On 8 April 1945, PCE-877 proceeded from an anchorage off the western beaches of Okinawa to anchor in Karame Retto harbor (Kerama Islands), and the next day rendezvoused with the flotilla and proceeded to Guam. Along the way on 10 April 1945 the ship made an urgent attack with a shallow pattern of depth charges on what turned out to be a whale. On 13 April 1945, the crew received news of the death of President Franklin D. Roosevelt, and a five-minute silence and prayer in his memory was observed on 14 April 1945. On 16 April orders came in that the group was to be diverted to Ulithi Atoll in the Caroline Islands for a 21-day availability, arriving 17 April 1945. Over these three weeks, the main engine was overhauled, further repairs to the starboard propeller we attempted and continued vibration issues reported to Service Squadron Ten.

On 13 May 1945, PCE-877 reported ready for sea, and was assigned as an escort vessel for Task Unit 94.18.10 heading back to Okinawa, departing 15 May 1945. The ship arrived at Okinawa 21 May 1945 and was ordered to continue screening and patrolling off the western beaches of Okinawa. At 2140 on 24 May 1945, "an enemy Betty (Mitsubishi G4M bomber) flying at 2000 ft. was taken under fire. 3 rounds of 3"/50; 119 rounds of 40MM and 97 rounds of 20MM ammunition were expended." Numerous enemy raids were reported over the next several days, but PCE-877 received no hits, nor expended ammunition.

At 0012 on 28 May 1945, an enemy plane passed directly overhead, causing radar-controlled anti-aircraft fire for several minutes, with hundreds of rounds bursting close aboard. No serious casualties were reported, with two men slightly wounded. Twelve minutes later (0024) an enemy suicide plane crashed into the USS LCS 119 (Landing Craft Support) just to the south of PCE-877's position. PCE-877 was the closest ship and proceeded to the LCS 119's aid. "The ship had been hit just aft of amidships on the starboard side and was burning badly. She had no pressure on her fire main and her magazines amidships were exploding. We were forced to back clear of her after coming alongside as an enemy plane was sighted several miles distance and approaching. We fired on this plane expending 1 round of 3"/50 and 24 rounds of 40mm ammunition. After firing, a small fire was observed in this plane. The plane was then fired on by another vessel after having passed over us. It turned in a slow circle and again approached this vessel but burned and crashed out of control 2,000 yards to our starboard beam. We then lowered our motor whale boat and proceeded alongside the U.S.S. LCS 119 to pick up survivors. 61 survivors from a crew of 75 were rescued, given first aid treatment and later turned over to USS PCE(R)-855 [(later named USS Rexburg - an Experimental Patrol Craft Escort (Rescue)]. Ten of the survivors were seriously wounded stretcher cases and a majority of the survivors were burned to varying degrees. At 0412 the port main engine failed due to a break in a lube oil line which in turn stripped a series of bearings on the crankshaft." At 1640 PCE-877 was ordered to Kerama Retto for repairs, where the ship was anchored from 29 May 1945 to 8 June 1945.

On 9 June 1945 PCE-877 relieved the PCS-1460 (Patrol Craft Sweeper) as patrol near Chimu Wan / Kin Bay area, and that evening encountered a native canoe at 0020. "Four men were in this canoe. The canoe was illuminated and two occupants took to the water about one mile from land. We fired upon the canoe when it became apparent that the canoe would be able to beach before we could get underway and the last two occupants took to the water. We destroyed the canoe and established a patrol in search for the swimmers but were unable to locate them. Numerous large snakes and other marine life were seen in the water which was not an inviting place to swim." PCE-877 was then ordered to proceed to Hagushi on western Okinawa to prepare to join a convoy as an escort.

PCE-877 sailed with TU 31.29.3 to Ulithi from 11 June to 17 June 1945, and then joined TU 11.11.4 bound for Leyte Island, Philippines as an escort from 18 to 21 June 1945. For nine days through 30 June 1945, the ship underwent repairs and logistics, including replacing the problematic starboard propeller. While at Leyte Island, the ship participated in amphibious training practice with Army troops at Hinunangan Bay from 1 July to 8 July, and then was sent to U.S. Naval Base Subic Bay for an engine overhaul and eight days availability.

For the remainder of July 1945 through 24 August 1945, the ship was stationed in Subic Bay and Lingayen Bay participating in further training exercises in amphibious landings conducted with Army troops, as well as patrol and escort duties. On 31 July 1945, the ship was designated as a senior escort vessel and commander of the anti-submarine warfare (ASW) screen in the transport anchorage area.

==== Japan Surrender ====
The crew of PCE-877 was participating in amphibious training practice with Army troops in and around Luzon and Subic Bay when the atomic bombings of Hiroshima and Nagasaki took place on 6 August and 9 August 1945. Japan then surrendered to the Allies on 15 August 1945. It is uncertain when news of the surrender and the end of hostilities reached PCE-877 crew (Fleet Admiral Chester Nimitz sent out a telegram to the entire Pacific Fleet on 15 August 1945.) The ship continued to patrol and provide escort in the Philippines following completion of the amphibious training on 17 August 1945.

Administratively, PCE-877 was formally reclassified PCE(C)-877 on 20 August 1945 (even though the conversion to Escort-Control took place 10 months prior at Pearl Harbor). And in late August 1945, Commanding Officer Lieutenant John R. Shea Jr., USNR, was relieved by Lieutenant Christian G. ("Dutch") Schmidt, USNR. Lieutenant Wirt P. Hoxie, USNR, replaced Lt. James B. Brady as Executive Officer. Lt. Shea would later be promoted to Lieutenant Commander and receive the Bronze Star for the Iwo Jima engagements.

On 25 August 1945 PCE-877 received orders to escort Transport Group Able en route to Tokyo Area. The ship had to return to Subic Bay due to weather conditions that day, but then set out at 1738 on 27 August 1945 for Tokyo. The group arrived in the afternoon of 1 September 1945, and the surrender was recorded as 0904 local time 2 September 1945 on the USS Missouri (BB-63) in Tokyo Bay. PCE(C)-877 is listed as one of five allied Submarine Chasers present for the formal surrender.

Of the 77 listed crew members in September 1945, 56 had served on PCE-877 since commission on 14 February 1944 (72%). After the surrender, the ship was stationed in Yokohama Bay off of Tokyo Bay through early October 1945. The ship had a large amounts of "Speed Letters" indicating discharges and an imminent return stateside in late September and early October 1945.

=== Post-War Atlantic operations ===
Following the end of World War II, the PCE(C)-877 returned to the United States by way of Pearl Harbor (December 1945-January 1946), where Commanding Officer Lieutenant Christian G. ("Dutch") Schmidt, USNR was relieved by Lieutenant Junior Grade John P. Johnson, USNR, with Lt. (jg) Clifford I.D. Beck appointed as Executive Officer.

After leaving Pearl Harbor, the PCE(C)-877 shipped to San Diego (February 1946), Balboa, Panama Canal Zone (March 1946), finally arriving in Charleston, South Carolina, in late March 1946. Lt. (jg) Lawrence E. Stream, USNR was appointed Executive Officer on 11 March 1946 after Lt.(jg) Beck was discharged. On 20 April 1946, Commanding Officer Lieutenant (jg) John P. Johnson, USNR was discharged, and XO Lt. (jg) Lawrence E. Stream was discharged on 1 May 1946. In fact, while the PCE(C)-877 had a post-war operating allowance of 67 crew members, records show on 1 April 1946 that only 44 crew remained on board, and by 1 July 1946, only 26 crew members were aboard. On 20 April 1946, Lieutenant William George (W.G.) Mann Jr., USNR assumed command of the PCE(C)-877.

From 1946 to April 1954 the ship was attached to Amphibious Control Squadron 2, exercising control and coordinating amphibious forces in the assaults from the sea and supporting embarked Marine forces once they are established ashore. During this assignment, the PCE(C)-877 engaged in exercises in the North Atlantic, Chesapeake Bay, and the Caribbean Sea.

=== Naval Reserve Training Ship - Great Lakes ===
In April 1954, the PCE(C)-877 was transitioned from active duty and reassigned as a Naval Reserve Training Ship for 9th Naval District. The ship proceeded from the Gulf of Mexico, via the Mississippi River and Illinois River to Chicago and reported to Naval Station Great Lakes. This coincided with the creation of the new Gunnery School at the Naval Station, which was dedicated in March 1954. On 27 October 1955, the ship was reclassified to PCE-877, its original classification, as it was no longer coordinating amphibious assaults and landings. Just four months later, on 15 February 1956, the ship was renamed Havre as part of a Navy-wide initiative to provide names to all remaining numbered ships. During its operation, Havre operated throughout the Great Lakes, engaging in 2-week cruises which provided valuable training for Naval Reservists, including anti-submarine warfare and gunnery exercises.

=== Decommissioning ===
PCE-877's final voyage was sailing with the Ninth Naval District Reserve Destroyer Division fleet. Havre had spent sixteen years primarily moored at USNTC Pier Great Lakes Illinois. At 0603 on Monday 27 April 1970, the ship slipped its lines for the final time in Illinois and made voyage for Philadelphia. At 1925 the ship moored port side to the USCG Pier in Manistee, Michigan, meeting up with the USS Portage (PCE-902) and USS Ely (PCE-880). Havre and Ely steamed out of Manistee together on 28 April 1970, crossed under the Mackinac Bridge at 20:31 and put into port at St. Ignace Municipal Pier at 22:05. On 30 April 1970 the two ships arrived and docked at Port Huron Seaway Terminal Pier in Port Huron, Michigan at 1609.

Both the 877 and 880 stayed in Port Huron until joined by the Portage on 2 May 1970, where the three ships continued through Lake St. Clair and the Detroit River, entering Lake Erie at 1420. The three ships entered the Maumee River and moored at the Toledo Marine Terminal Pier at 1908. On 4 May 1970 the ships departed Toledo Harbor and steamed for Cleveland, and then Erie, Pennsylvania on 5 May 1970, Buffalo Harbor on 6 May 1970. On 9 May 1970, the ships moved west to an anchorage near Port Colborne, Ontario, Canada and then entered the Welland Canal the next day, entering Lake Ontario at 1812 in a column formation and on 11 May 1945 embarked various Seaway Pilots for transiting segments of the St. Lawrence Seaway, and mooring on 12 May 1945 in Montreal, Quebec, Canada. Joining the trio in Montreal were the USS Whitehall (PCE-856) and the USS Hollidaysburg (PCS-1385). The next day (13 May), PCE-877 arrived in Quebec City, along with new member of the group USS Parle (DE 708). On 14 May 1970, the six ships (now called Task Unit 132.9.1) departed in a column formation, steaming for Halifax, Nova Scotia, arriving the morning of 17 May 1970, and departing again the next morning for Naval Weapons Station Earle Pier Complex, Sandy Hook Bay, New Jersey, arriving the morning of 20 May 1970. At 1200 the crew commenced offloading all remaining ammunition. The task unit then steamed around Cape May, New Jersey, entering the Delaware River Channel, and moored at 1240 on 21 May 1970 at Pier #1 Philadelphia Naval Shipyard. This would be the last time the Harve would move under her own power.

Decommissioning activities commenced in Philadelphia. On 2 June 1970, all main engines, generators and associated equipment placed out of commission. On 5 June 1970, all hazardous material offloaded, and all fuel and lube oil was offloaded on 11 June 1970. PCE-877 passed both the preliminary inspection conducted by the INACTSHIPMAINTFAC personnel on 18 June 1970, and the final inspection on 24 June 1970.

From the Final Deck Logs - Remarks Sheets - Commanding Officer R.C. White, Lt.(jg), USNR Wednesday 1 July 1970, at Philadelphia, PA

- 00:00 Moored port side to Pier #1 Philadelphia Naval Shipyard with standard mooring lines doubled. Ely, is moored outboard. Portage and Whitehall are moored ahead. Other ships present include miscellaneous vessels of the US Atlantic Fleet. SOPA (senior officer present afloat) is Commanding Officer USS Lowry (DO-770).
- 07:45 Mustered the crew at quarters. Absentees: none
- 10:00 Commenced decommissioning ceremony
- 10:05 Colors hauled down and watch secured. Custody of Havre transferred to Commanding Officer, Inactive Ships Maintenance Facility, Philadelphia
- Decommissioned. Havre was thus struck from the US Navy roster of ships on 1 July 1970.

The final fate of Havre is unknown. Several of the other ships in her final task unit lived longer in the commercial world:

- Portage, Havre's sister ship in Illinois, was renamed Atlantic Venture and served commercial fisheries in Virginia
- Ely, launched ten weeks after PCE-877 from the same Albina Engine & Machine Works, Portland, Oregon, was sold to the state of Maine as a research vessel, and also was owned by companies in Delaware and Louisiana, before also joining PCE-902 and being renamed Atlantic Mist. It was sunk 16 January 2010 as part of an artificial reef outside of the Delaware Bay.
- Whitehall was converted to a tug in 1974, ended up in Virginia with PCE-902, renamed Atlantic Shore, and was last seen in Louisiana - fate unknown

== Decorations ==
PCE-877 received the following awards during her career:

- Asiatic-Pacific Campaign Medal with two battle stars (for its performance at the Battle of Iwo Jima and the Battle of Okinawa)
- World War II Victory Medal
- Navy Occupation Medal
- National Defense Service Medal with star
