= ROKS Dangpo =

1943–1967 ship of the South Korean navy

History

United States
- Name: PCE-842
- Builder: Pullman Standard Car, Chicago
- Laid down: 12 June 1943
- Launched: 14 November 1943
- Commissioned: 29 January 1944
- Renamed: USS Marfa (PCE-842), 15 February 1956
- Fate: Transferred to South Korea, 13 December 1961

South Korea
- Name: Dangpo
- Acquired: 13 December 1961
- Fate: Sunk by North Korean coastal artillery, 19 January 1967

General characteristics
- Class & type: PCE-842-class patrol craft (in U.S. Navy service)
- Displacement: 914 tons (Full Load)
- Length: 184.5 ft (56.2 m)
- Beam: 33 ft (10 m)
- Draft: 9.75 ft (2.97 m)
- Installed power: 2,200 hp (1,600 kW)
- Propulsion: Main: 2 × GM 12-278A diesel engines; Auxiliary: 2 × GM 6-71 diesel engines with 100KW gen and 1 × GM 3-268A diesel engine with 60KW gen
- Speed: 16 knots (30 km/h; 18 mph) (maximum),
- Range: 6,600 nmi (12,200 km; 7,600 mi) at 11 knots (20 km/h; 13 mph)
- Complement: 79
- Armament: 1 × Mk.26 3-inch/50-caliber gun dual purpose gun; 3 × single Bofors 40 mm gun; 4 × Mk.10 Oerlikon 20 mm guns; 4 × M2 .50 cal (12.7 mm) machine guns

ROKS Dangpo (PCEC 56) was a patrol craft of the Republic of Korea Navy (ROKN). Originally built as USS PCE-842, a PCE-842-class patrol craft for the United States Navy during World War II. Dangpo was acquired by South Korea on 13 December 1961 and sunk by North Korean coastal artillery fire on 19 January 1967.

== History ==
=== U.S. service ===
PCE-842 was laid down by Pullman Standard Car Manufacturing Co. on 12 June 1943; reclassified PCE(R)‑842 on 19 June 1943; again reclassified PCE‑842 on 15 July 1943; launched 14 November 1943; placed in ferry commission 14 November 1943 for transfer down the Mississippi River; and commissioned at New Orleans, on 29 January 1944, Lt. G. C. Homans in command.

After shakedown along the coast of Florida, PCE‑842 departed Key West on 15 March 1944 for convoy escort duty under the 4th Fleet out of Trinidad, British West Indies. It reached Teteron Bay 20 March and on the 31st sailed on its initial escort run. For the next six months, PCE‑842 guarded convoys between Trinidad and Recife, Brazil, conducting intensive antisubmarine training between escort voyages. Arriving at Key West on 3 December, she left Florida on 21 January 1945 with three sister ships for the Panama Canal and Hollandia, New Guinea, arriving 1 March. Nine days later it sailed via the Palaus for duty with the local defense forces of the Philippine sea frontier, and for the remainder of the war conducted antisubmarine patrols and gave escort service for the massive volume of shipping moving about the Philippines.

Following the Surrender of Japan, PCE‑842 remained in the western Pacific as a weather station ship, ranging from the Philippines to the Marshall Islands. It returned to San Pedro, California, 29 August 1947, then sailed via the Panama Canal for New Orleans, arriving 28 September. PCE‑842 decommissioned at New Orleans 7 November 1947 and immediately began duty as a Naval Reserve training ship, cruising the Gulf of Mexico and the Caribbean, and visiting Mexico and Cuba.

PCE‑842 trained the Naval Reserve until 13 June 1955, when it sailed to Green Cove Springs to enter the Atlantic Reserve Fleet 17 August. While berthed at Green Cove Springs, it was named Marfa (PCE‑842) on 15 February 1956 after Marfa, Texas. On 20 March 1961 it was authorized for transfer to South Korea. The ship's name was struck from the Navy list on 1 June 1961.

=== South Korean service ===
Under terms of the Military Assistance Program, the ship was transferred to South Korea on 13 December 1961. Commissioned as ROKS Dangpo (PCEC 56), it served in the ROKN until its sinking in the Sea of Japan, north of the maritime demarcation line off the eastern coast of the Korean Peninsula by North Korean coastal artillery on 19 January 1967. Thirty-nine of the 79-man crew were killed.
