= USS Fairview =

Patrol vessel of the United States Navy

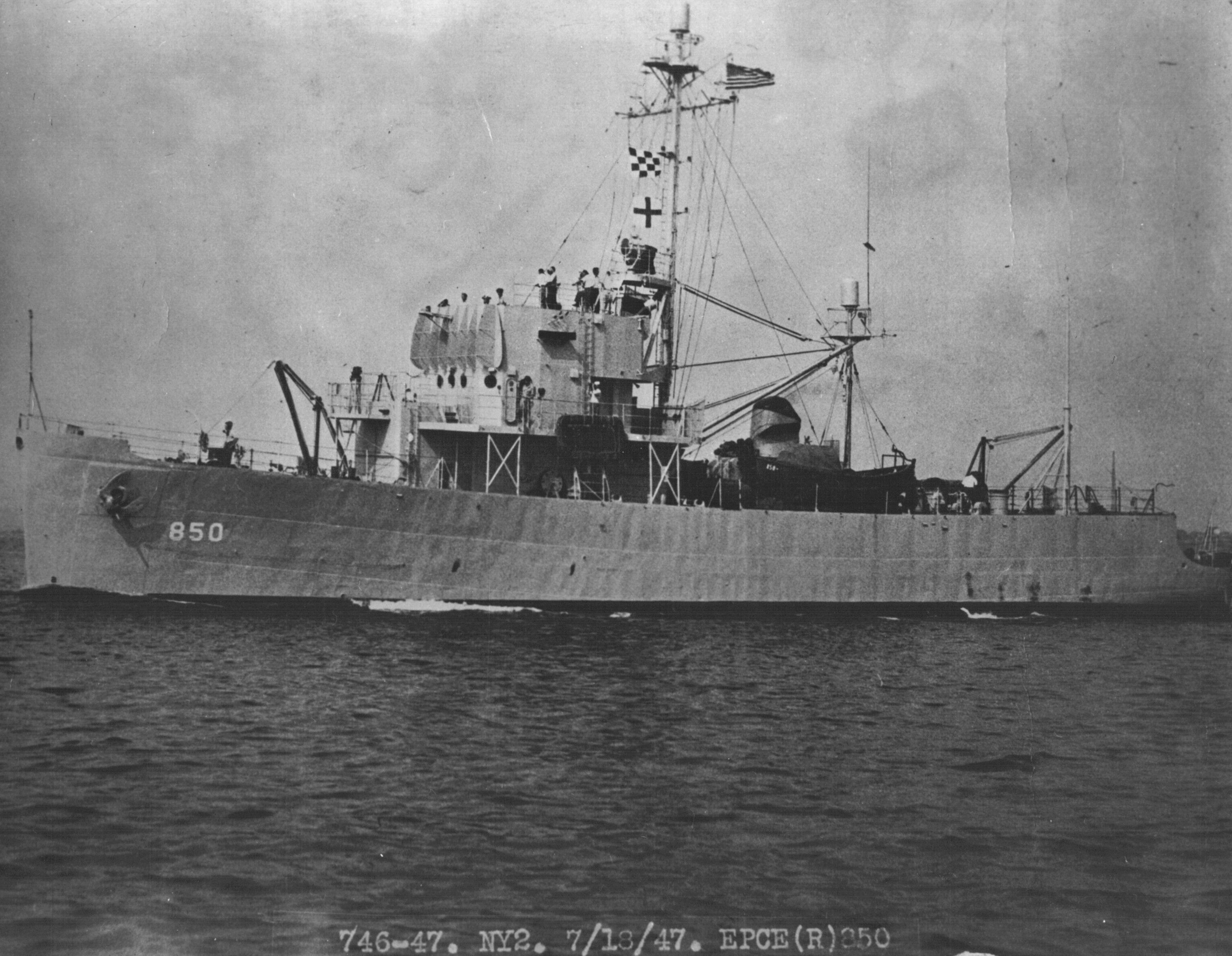
- Fairview as PCE(R)-850 in July 1947

History

United States
- Name: USS Fairview
- Namesake: Fairview, New Jersey
- Builder: Pullman-Standard Car Manufacturing Co., Chicago, Illinois
- Laid down: 6 October 1943
- Launched: 8 February 1944
- Commissioned: 17 April 1944, as USS PCE(R)-850
- Decommissioned: 1 May 1968
- Renamed: Fairview, 15 February 1956
- Reclassified: EPCE(R)-850 (Experimental Patrol Craft Escort (Rescue)), 1959
- Fate: Sold

General characteristics
- Class & type: PCER-848 class armed rescue ship
- Displacement: 903 long tons (917 t)
- Length: 184 ft 6 in (56.24 m)
- Beam: 33 ft 1 in (10.08 m)
- Draft: 9 ft 5 in (2.87 m)
- Propulsion: 2 × 900 bhp (671 kW) General Motors 12-567A diesel engines; Falk single reduction gear; 2 shafts
- Speed: 15.7 knots (29.1 km/h; 18.1 mph)
- Complement: 99 officers and enlisted
- Armament: 1 × 3"/50 caliber guns; 2 × 40 mm AA guns; 2 × Depth charge tracks; 2 × Depth charge projectors

USS Fairview (EPCE(R)-850) was a United States Navy PCE(R)-848-class Patrol Craft Escort (Rescue), in commission from April 1944 to May 1968. It was named after Fairview, New Jersey. in Bergen county The ship was present at the surrender of Japan in Tokyo Bay at the end of World War II.

== Role ==
The PCER-848 class was an armed rescue ship built on the hull of the PCE (Patrol Craft Escort) by the Pullman-Standard Car Manufacturing Company in Chicago, Illinois. The ships were to serve three missions: damage control / firefighting; casualty treatment / evacuation; and patrol / guardship. Each ship's hospital contained 65 beds, with a surgical suite, and X-ray facilities. The medical department consisted of a staff of 11 doctors and hospital corpsmen.

Three ships of the class—PCER-848, -849 and -850—were refitted and their hospital spaces converted into communications centers to support the US Army's activities in the Pacific Theater.

== Service history ==
The ship was laid down on 6 October 1943 by the Pullman-Standard Car Manufacturing Company of Chicago, and launched on 8 February 1944. Commissioned as USS PCE(R)-850 on 17 April 1944, the ship was converted to a communications ship at Brisbane, Australia, in September 1944.

The ship was engaged in testing anti-submarine devices during the period of 1948–1950, based out of New London, Connecticut. It was named USS Fairview on 15 February 1956, and was reclassified as EPCE(R)-850, an Experimental Patrol Craft Escort (Rescue), in 1959.

The ship was decommissioned on 1 May 1968, and later sold.

== See also ==
- USS Somersworth PCE(R)-849
