= PCE-842-class patrol craft =

United States Navy ship class of submarine chasers

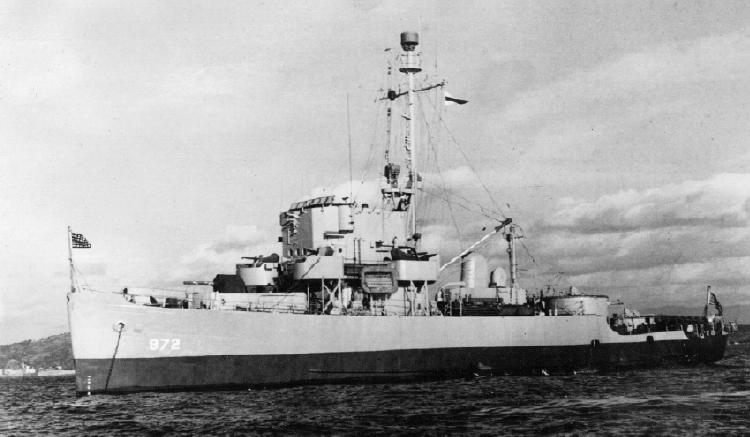
- PCEC-872

Class overview
- Builders: Pullman Company, IL (34); Albina Engine Works, OR (20); Willamette Iron & Steel, OR (14)
- Operators: United States Navy; United States Coast Guard; Royal Navy; Republic of Korea Navy; Mexican Navy; Ecuadorian Navy; Colombian National Navy; Republic of Vietnam Navy; Republic of China Navy; Cuban Revolutionary Navy; Philippine Navy; Myanmar Navy
- Subclasses: Roofdier-class frigate; Malvar-class corvette
- Built: 1942–1945
- Completed: 68
- Preserved: ~2

General characteristics
- Displacement: 850 long tons (860 t) standard, 903 long tons (917 t) full load
- Length: 180 ft (54.86 m) wl; 184 ft 6 in (56.24 m) oa
- Beam: 33 ft 1 in (10.08 m)
- Draft: 9 ft 5 in (2.87 m)
- Propulsion: 2 diesel engines, 2 shafts; 2,000 bhp (1,500 kW) total
- Speed: 15.7 kn (29.1 km/h; 18.1 mph)
- Range: 8,500 nmi (15,700 km; 9,800 mi) at 12 kn (22 km/h; 14 mph)
- Complement: 96
- Armament: 1 × 3"/50 caliber gun; 6 × Bofors 40 mm guns (3 twin mounts); 4 × 20 mm guns; 1 × Hedgehog anti-submarine projector; Depth charges

The PCE-842-class patrol craft escort was a United States Navy (USN) ship class of submarine chasers designed during World War II. The PCE-842-class was the only class ever designated by the USN as the "patrol craft escort" (PCE) type (a PCE-905-class was planned, but none of the operational vessels served under the nominal class). The PCE design was derived from the 180-foot (55 m) Admirable-class minesweeper to complement the 173-foot (53 m) PC-461-class submarine chasers that were used for anti-submarine warfare (ASW) in coastal areas. At 185 feet long and 640 tons, the PCE is more than twice the displacement of the PC but with a less powerful engine also much slower; however, because of its larger size, the PCE was able to undertake longer-range tasks over PC-461-class vessels. The USN envisaged the PCE as enabling PCs and smaller vessels to undertake coastal patrols without being called-upon as often to perform open ocean and convoy escort duties, while simultaneously freeing-up some larger vessels - such as destroyer escorts and destroyers - from convoy ASW duties. The PCE-482-class had a standard crew complement of 99 officers and men. The class would ultimately see 68 total vessels built, serving with multiple navies around the world.

== Development and design ==
The Admirable class had been developed as a smaller minesweeper than the Raven-class and Auk-class minesweepers, which would be cheaper and easier to build, while still having good seakeeping capabilities in high seas. An escort derivative of the new design was proposed for supply under the Lend-Lease scheme to Britain's Royal Navy (which had already rejected the Admirable class as minesweepers), and when the United States Navy realized that a shortage of engines might prevent it from receiving additional PC-461-class submarine chasers beyond those already on order, it was decided to build the escort variant, designated as Patrol Craft Escort (PCE) for both the US Navy and Royal Navy.

The ships were 184 ft 6 in (56.24 m) long overall and 180 ft 0 in (54.86 m) between perpendiculars, with a beam of 33 ft 1 in (10.08 m) and a draft of 9 ft 5 in (2.87 m). Displacement was 850 long tons (860 t) standard and 903 long tons (917 t) full load. They were powered by two 1,000 horsepower (750 kW) General Motors 12-278A diesel engines driving two shafts via single reduction gearing. This gave a speed of 15.7 kn (18.1 mph; 29.1 km/h). The ships had a range of 8,500 nmi (9,800 mi; 15,700 km) at 12 kn (14 mph; 22 km/h).

The normal armament on completion consisted of a single 3 in (76 mm) gun forward, two 40 mm anti-aircraft guns, backed up by 4 or 5 Oerlikon 20 mm cannon. A Hedgehog anti-submarine mortar was mounted between the 3 inch gun and the ship's bridge, while depth charge projectors and rails were mounted on the ships' fantail. Later ships were fitted with a third Bofors gun and additional Oerlikons, while ships were later modified to mount three twin Bofors mounts and four Oerlikons. Some ships (including PCE-867) were armed with two 3-inch guns and three Oerlikons.

== Detection equipment ==
The class was fitted with radar, sonar and other detection equipment for ASW.

== Conversions ==
Some PCEs were later converted to Rescue Escorts, PCE(R), and to Amphibious Control Vessels, PCE(C), which were used in many U.S. amphibious landing operations during World War II, especially Leyte Gulf and Normandy. Two such ships, which were converted to Rescue Escorts, were the USS Somersworth and USS Fairview, both of which were present at the surrender of Japan in Tokyo Bay on 2 September 1945.

== Production ==
Sixty-eight Patrol Craft Escorts were built for the US Navy, and seventeen were delivered under the Lend-Lease Program to Allies during World War II. The PCEs proved to be an inexpensive substitute for larger and more valuable destroyers and destroyer escorts in convoy escort work.

== Philippine Navy ==
As of 2014, the Philippine Navy still operates the Miguel Malvar class with six PCEs as gun corvettes, with all the ships' ASW equipment already removed. The PCE is the most numerous major ship class of the Philippine Navy that, at one time, numbered more than ten vessels.

== Ships ==
68 boats listed: 827 ... 860, 867 ... 886, 891 ... 904

Ship name	Hull number	Builder	Original navy of service	Comm.	Decomm.	Status
Kilbernie	PCE-827	Pullman Company, Chicago, Illinois	Royal Navy	16 July 1943	June 1945	Sold to a commercial interest, 1947; sold for scrap, August 1997
Kilbride	PCE-828	Pullman Company, Chicago, Illinois	Royal Navy	31 July 1943	1945	Sold to a commercial interest, 1947; sold for scrap, 1988
Kilchatten	PCE-829	Pullman Company, Chicago, Illinois	Royal Navy	16 August 1943	12 July 1945	Sold to a commercial interest, 1947; sold for scrap, 1983
Kilchrenan	PCE-830	Pullman Company, Chicago, Illinois	Royal Navy	31 August 1943	1945	Sold to a commercial interest, 1947; currently in service as of 2019 as a ferry. After conversion to ferry and passenger boat she sailed under the name MS Sunnhordland, a name she still carries. The ship was fully restored in 2016 and is now operating as a historic ship at the west coast of Norway.
Kildary	PCE-831	Pullman Company, Chicago, Illinois	Royal Navy	14 September 1943	1945	Sold to a commercial interest, 1947; sold for scrap, 1980
Kildwick	PCE-832	Pullman Company, Chicago, Illinois	Royal Navy	27 September 1943	1945	Sold to a commercial interest, 1947; sunk while under tow, October 1983
Kilham	PCE-833	Pullman Company, Chicago, Illinois	Royal Navy	9 October 1943	1945	Built in 1943 for the US Navy by the Pullman Car Company. Constructed of reinforced steel. Laid down 1943 February 26 as PCE-833 by the Pullman Standard Car Co., Chicago, IL. Launched 1943 August. Transferred 1943 October To Great Britain and commissioned HMS Kilham (Z 07); Reclassified BEC-7. Returned 1946 to U.S. custody in December; Struck from the Navy Register in 1947. Sold 1949 to S/A Investment (FylkesbaataneSogne og Fjordane, Mgrs.) of Bergen, Norway. Converted 1950 renamed M/S Sognefjord passenger ship. Sold 1958 to FylkesbataaneSogne og Fjordane of Bergen; Operated on the Norwegian west coast until 1982. Sold 1982 to Filmeffekt A/S of Oslo, Norway, and renamed Orion. Sold 1984 to K/S Orion Film A/S of Bergen and laid up. Sold 1987 to Matkat OY of Helsingfors, Finland. Sold 1991 to Orion Risteilyt O/Y of Hamina, Finland, and renamed Orion II. Sold 1996 to Jaako Mathias Eriksson of Honduras. Sold 1997 renamed ORIENT EXPLORER. Listed for sale in Sabah, Malaysia, 2019 for $129,000.
Kilkenzie	PCE-834	Pullman Company, Chicago, Illinois	Royal Navy	20 October 1943	July 1945	Sold to a commercial interest, 1948; sold for scrap, 1978
Kilkhampton	PCE-835	Pullman Company, Chicago, Illinois	Royal Navy	30 Oct 1943	1945	Returned to the United States, December 1946; fate unknown
Kilmacolm	PCE-836	Pullman Company, Chicago, Illinois	Royal Navy	6 November 1943	1945	Sold to a commercial interest, 1952; fate unknown
Kilmarnock	PCE-837	Pullman Company, Chicago, Illinois	Royal Navy	13 November 1943	1945	Sold to a commercial interest, 1949; wrecked 5 January 1951
Kilmartin	PCE-838	Pullman Company, Chicago, Illinois	Royal Navy	11 December 1943	1945	Sold to a commercial interest, 1947; sold for scrap, 12 June 1969
Kilmelford	PCE-839	Pullman Company, Chicago, Illinois	Royal Navy	8 December 1943	1945	Sold to a commercial interest, 1949; fate unknown
Kilmington	PCE-840	Pullman Company, Chicago, Illinois	Royal Navy	11 December 1943	1945	Sold to a commercial interest, 1951; sold for scrap, 2007
Kilmore	PCE-841	Pullman Company, Chicago, Illinois	Royal Navy	24 December 1943	1945	Sold to a commercial interest, 1947; fate unknown
Marfa	PCE-842	Pullman Company, Chicago, Illinois	United States Navy	29 January 1944	17 August 1955	Transferred to South Korea, 18 December 1961; Sunk by North Korean shore battery fire, 19 January 1967
Skowhegan	PCE-843	Pullman Company, Chicago, Illinois	United States Navy	30 January 1944	March 1955	Sold to a commercial interest, 1961; fate unknown
n/a	PCE-844	Pullman Company, Chicago, Illinois	United States Navy	18 February 1944	November 1947	sold to the Mexican Navy and named ARM Pedro Sainz De Barandas (PO 123). Fate unknown.
Worland	PCE-845	Pullman Company, Chicago, Illinois	United States Navy	1 March 1944	25 May 1964	Transferred to United States Navy Reserve as Naval Reserve Training Ship for 9th Naval District (Chicago) on 11 December 1950 and served on the Great Lakes. Transferred to State of North Carolina, Cape Fear Technical Institute, Wilmington, NC, 6 August 1964 and renamed R/V Advance II. Sold in 1980 to the Standard Products Co., Inc. of Wilmington, North Carolina. Donated to the North Carolina Division of Marine Fisheries 15 October 1993. Sunk 21 June 1994 off Kitty Hawk (Artificial Reef 145) as part of their artificial reef program.
Eunice	PCE 846	Pullman Company, Chicago, Illinois	United States Navy	4 March 1944	Unknown	Transferred to Ecuador, 29 November 1960; fate unknown
n/a	PCE-847	Pullman Company, Chicago, Illinois	United States Navy	18 March 1944	Unknown	Transferred to Mexico, November 1947; fate unknown
n/a	PCE-848	Pullman Company, Chicago, Illinois	United States Navy	30 March 1944	March 1946	Sold for scrap, January 1947
Somersworth	PCE-849	Pullman Company, Chicago, Illinois	United States Navy	11 April 1944	September 1965	Sold for scrap, 1972
Fairview	PCE-850	Pullman Company, Chicago, Illinois	United States Navy	17 April 1944	1 May 1968	Sold to a commercial interest, 1969; fate unknown
Rockville	PCE-851	Pullman Company, Chicago, Illinois	United States Navy	15 May 1944	21 December 1968	Transferred to Colombia, 1969 as ARC San Andres (BO 151) before being sent to the Colombian Coast Guard. Decommissioned in the late 1980s.
Brattleboro	PCE-852	Pullman Company, Chicago, Illinois	United States Navy	26 May 1944	1 November 1965	Transferred to South Vietnam, 11 July 1966; later fled to the Philippines in 1975 after the fall of South Vietnam. Served in the Philippine Navy as BRP Miguel Malvar. Decommissioned 2021. Sunk 5/5/2025 while under tow, hours before she was to be expended as a live fire target.
Amherst	PCE-853	Pullman Company, Chicago, Illinois	United States Navy	15 June 1944	6 February 1970	Transferred to South Vietnam, 3 June 1970; later fled to the Philippines in 1975 after the fall of South Vietnam; served in the PN as BRP Datu Marikudo, decommissioned 09 Dec 2010; equipment stripped for spares, hull sold for scrap
n/a	PCE-854	Pullman Company, Chicago, Illinois	United States Navy	4 January 1945	1945	Sold to a commercial interest, 1945; fate unknown
Rexburg	PCE-855	Pullman Company, Chicago, Illinois	United States Navy	1 November 1944	2 March 1970	Sold to a commercial interest, 28 October 1970; last documented, 2009; fate unknown
Whitehall	PCE-856	Pullman Company, Chicago, Illinois	United States Navy	11 November 1944	1 July 1970	Transferred to United States Navy Reserve as Naval Reserve Training Ship for 4th Naval District (Philadelphia) July 1946. Decommissioned 1 July 1970 and sold to Eastern Seaboard Pile-Driving of Montvale and renamed Donna Marie. Converted to a tug in 1974. Sold to Standard Products Co. Inc. of Reedsville, Virginia, and renamed Atlantic Surf in 1980. Sold to Omega Protein Inc. of Hammond, Louisiana, and renamed Atlantic Shore. Fate unknown.
Marysville	PCE-857	Pullman Company, Chicago, Illinois	United States Navy	26 April 1945	July 1970	Sold to a commercial interest, 1975; last documented, 1995; fate unknown
Jackson	PCE-858	Pullman Company, Chicago, Illinois	United States NavyUnited States Coast Guard	16 May 1945	24 July 1947	Transferred to United States Coast Guard to replace the sunken USCGC Jackson (WSC-142). Renamed USCGC Jackson (WPC-120), she was berthed at Curtis Bay, Maryland, until decommission due to lack of crew. Sold to a commercial interest, 23 December 1947; fate unknown
n/a	PCE-859	Pullman Company, Chicago, Illinois	United States Navy	10 March 1945	1947	Fate unknown
n/a	PCE-860	Pullman Company, Chicago, Illinois	United States Navy	31 March 1945	April 1946	recommissioned as USCGC Bedloe (WPC-121)
n/a	PCE-867	Albina Engine & Machine Works, Portland, Oregon	United States Navy	20 June 1943	Unknown	Transferred to the Republic of China, 7 February 1948; damaged in action with Communist Chinese forces 14 November 1965 and later scrapped
n/a	PCE-868	Albina Engine & Machine Works, Portland, Oregon	United States Navy	31 August 1943	29 October 1947	Transferred to Mexico, 8 November 1947; sold for scrap, 1995
n/a	PCE-869	Albina Engine & Machine Works, Portland, Oregon	United States Navy	19 September 1943	1 July 1971	Transferred to Republic of China, 28 August 1945; fate unknown
Dania	PCE-870	Albina Engine & Machine Works, Portland, Oregon	United States Navy	5 October 1943	18 October 1946	Transferred to South Korea, 9 December 1961; fate unknown
n/a	PCE-871	Albina Engine & Machine Works, Portland, Oregon	United States Navy	29 October 1943	24 November 1947	Transferred to Mexico, 24 November 1947; sold for scrap, 1965
n/a	PCE-872	Albina Engine & Machine Works, Portland, Oregon	United States Navy	29 November 1943	Unknown	Transferred to Cuba, 1 October 1947; fate unknown
n/a	PCE-873	Albina Engine & Machine Works, Portland, Oregon	United States Navy	15 December 1943	1947	Transferred to South Korea, 1 November 1974; fate unknown
Pascagoula	PCE-874	Albina Engine & Machine Works, Portland, Oregon	United States Navy	31 December 1943	1 May 1959	Transferred to Ecuador, 5 December 1960; fate unknown
n/a	PCE-875	Albina Engine & Machine Works, Portland, Oregon	United States Navy	19 January 1944	Unknown	Transferred to Mexico, November 1947; fate unknown
Lodestone	PCE-876	Albina Engine & Machine Works, Portland, Oregon	United States Navy	10 June 1944	21 February 1975	Sold for scrap, 1 May 1976
Havre	PCE-877	Albina Engine & Machine Works, Portland, Oregon	United States Navy	14 February 1944	1 July 1970	Transferred to United States Navy Reserve as Naval Reserve Training Ship for 9th Naval District (Chicago) in April 1954 and served on the Great Lakes until struck from Navy list 1 July 1970. Fate unknown.
Buttress	PCE-878	Albina Engine & Machine Works, Portland, Oregon	United States Navy	13 March 1944	24 February 1947	Sold to a commercial interest, 1952; sunk as a target, 1990s
Magnet	PCE-879	Albina Engine & Machine Works, Portland, Oregon	United States Navy	10 July 1944	1975	Sunk as a target 4 March 1976
Ely	PCE-880	Albina Engine & Machine Works, Portland, Oregon	United States Navy	29 April 1944	1 July 1970	Transferred to United States Navy Reserve as Naval Reserve Training Ship for 9th Naval District (Chicago) in August 1947 and served on the Great Lakes. Transferred 3 September 1970 to the State of Maine (Southern Maine Vocational Technical Institute) South Portland, ME and renamed R/V Aqualab II. Sold in 1972 to Kirks Marine Enterprise, Inc. of Dover, Delaware. Sold in 1975 to Norman Industries, Inc. of Lafayette, Louisiana. Acquired in 1978 by Standard Products Co., Inc. of Kilmarnock, Virginia, and renamed Atlantic Mist. Acquired in 1989 by Ampro Fisheries, Inc. of Burgess, Virginia. Acquired by Omega Protein, Inc. of Moss Point, Mississippi. Sunk 16 January 2010 as part of an artificial reef approximately 26 miles southeast of Indian River Inlet, Delaware.
n/a	PCE-881	Albina Engine & Machine Works, Portland, Oregon	United States Navy	31 July 1944	Unknown	Transferred to the Philippines, July 1948; commissioned as BRP Cebu, decommissioned 1 Oct 2019
n/a	PCE-882	Albina Engine & Machine Works, Portland, Oregon	United States Navy	23 February 1945	Unknown	Transferred to South Korea, 1 November 1974; fate unknown
Deperm	PCE-883	Albina Engine & Machine Works, Portland, Oregon	United States Navy	1945	21 February 1975	Sunk as a target, 22 September 1982
n/a	PCE-884	Albina Engine & Machine Works, Portland, Oregon	United States Navy	30 March 1945	Unknown	Transferred to the Philippines, in June 1948; commissioned as BRP Negros Occidental, decommissioned 2010 Dec 9, equipment stripped for spares, hull sold for scrap
n/a	PCE-885	Albina Engine & Machine Works, Portland, Oregon	United States Navy	30 April 1945	Unknown	Transferred to the Philippines, 1 June 1948; commissioned as RPS Leyte, ran aground and sank, 1979
Banning	PCE-886	Albina Engine & Machine Works, Portland, Oregon	United States Navy	31 May 1945	1 May 1961	Became a museum ship, July 1961; sold to a commercial interest, 1972; sank, 1 October 1973
n/a	PCE-891	Willamette Iron and Steel Works, Portland, Oregon	United States Navy	15 June 1944	Unknown	Transferred to the Philippines, 1 June 1948; commissioned as BRP Pangasinan, decommissioned 2021 Mar 1. Sunk as a target on 26 April 2023 as part of the Balikatan 2023 exercise.
Somerset	PCE-892	Willamette Iron and Steel Works, Portland, Oregon	United States Navy	8 July 1944	March 1955	Transferred to South Korea, 13 December 1961; fate unknown
n/a	PCE-893	Willamette Iron and Steel Works, Portland, Oregon	United States Navy	25 July 1944	20 November 1947	Transferred to Cuba, 20 November 1947; fate unknown
Farmington	PCE-894	Willamette Iron and Steel Works, Portland, Oregon	United States Navy	10 August 1944	19 December 1947	Transferred to United States Navy Reserve as Naval Reserve Training Ship for 9th Naval District (Chicago) in 1948 and served on the Great Lakes. Removed from Navy List on 1 December 1964. Transferred to Burma, 31 May 1965; sold for scrap, 2000
Crestview	PCE-895	Willamette Iron and Steel Works, Portland, Oregon	United States Navy	30 October 1944	Unknown	Transferred to South Vietnam 29 November 1961; escaped to the Philippines, 1975; commissioned in PhN as BRP Sultan Kudarat, retired 2019 July 5
n/a	PCE-896	Willamette Iron and Steel Works, Portland, Oregon	United States Navy	27 November 1944	Unknown	Transferred to South Korea, 1 November 1974; fate unknown
n/a	PCE-897	Willamette Iron and Steel Works, Portland, Oregon	United States Navy	6 January 1945	Unknown	Transferred to the Philippines in April 1948; commissioned in PhN as BRP Iloilo, decommissioned 2016 Sep, equipment stripped for spares, hull awaiting disposal
n/a	PCE-898	Willamette Iron and Steel Works, Portland, Oregon	United States Navy	24 January 1945	Unknown	Transferred to South Korea 1 November 1974; fate unknown
Lamar	PCE-899	Willamette Iron and Steel Works, Portland, Oregon	United States Navy	17 March 1945	30 September 1969	Transferred to United States Navy Reserve as Naval Reserve Training Ship for 9th Naval District (Milwaukee) on 13 December 1950 and served on the Great Lakes. Transferred to U.S. Coast Guard 29 July 1964. Arrived Monterey, California 14 December 1965 as training vessel. Decommissioned 30 September 1969. Sold as scrap to Foison Industries Corporation in Taiwan 8 November 1971.
Groton	PCE-900	Willamette Iron and Steel Works, Portland, Oregon	United States Navy	12 April 1944	19 August 1955	Sold to a commercial interest, 1975; abandoned near Reedville, Virginia
Parris Island	PCE-901	Willamette Iron and Steel Works, Portland, Oregon	United States Navy	30 October 1944	19 June 1947	Sold to a commercial interest, 20 January 1948; sold for scrap, 1990
Portage	PCE-902	Willamette Iron and Steel Works, Portland, Oregon	United States Navy	30 April 1945	1949	Transferred to United States Navy Reserve as Naval Reserve Training Ship for 9th Naval District (Milwaukee) 7 May 1950 and served on the Great Lakes until struck from Navy list 1 July 1970. Sold to Standard Products Co., Inc. of Kilmarnock, Virginia, and renamed Atlantic Venture. Acquired in 1989 by Ampro Fisheries, Inc. of Burgess, Virginia. Fate unknown.
Batesburg	PCE-903	Willamette Iron and Steel Works, Portland, Oregon	United States Navy	16 May 1945	6 September 1955	Transferred to South Korea, 13 December 1961; fate unknown
Gettysburg	PCE-904	Willamette Iron and Steel Works, Portland, Oregon	United States Navy	31 May 1945	2 September 1955	Sold for scrap 23 June 1960

== See also ==
- List of patrol vessels of the United States Navy

== Sources ==
- Friedman, Norman (1987). U.S. Small Combatants: Including PT-Boats, Subchasers and the Brown-Water Navy: An Illustrated Design History. Annapolis, Maryland, USA: Naval Institute Press. ISBN 0-87021-713-5.
- Elliott, Peter (1977). Allied Escort Ships of World War II: A complete survey. London: Macdonald and Jane's. ISBN 0-356-08401-9.
- Gardiner, Robert; Chesneau, Roger (1980). Conway's All The World's Fighting Ships 1922–1946. London: Conway Maritime Press. ISBN 0-85177-146-7.
- Lenton, H. T. (1974). American Gunboats and Minesweepers. WW2 Fact Files. London: Macdonald and Jane's. ISBN 0-356-08064-1.
