= USS Lamar (PCE-899) =

Patrol vessel of the United States Navy

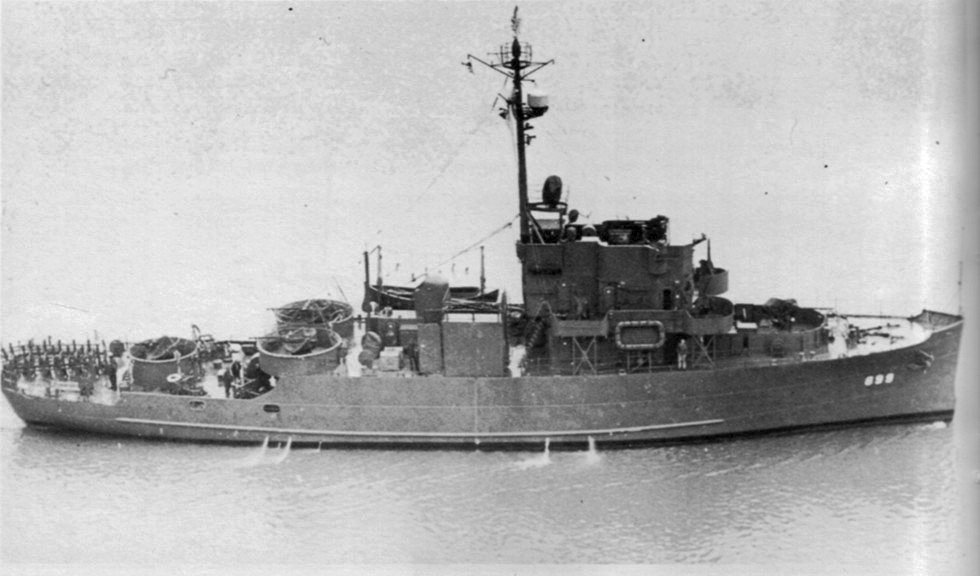
- USS Lamar (PCE-899)

History

United States
- Name: Lamar
- Namesake: Lamar County, Alabama; Lamar County, Georgia; Lamar County, Mississippi; Lamar County, Texas
- Ordered: as PCR-899
- Laid down: 11 January 1943
- Launched: 11 August 1943
- Commissioned: 17 March 1945 (USN); 13 December 1960 (USN); 29 July 1964 (USCG)
- Decommissioned: 16 December 1949 (USN); 28 May 1964 (USN); 30 September 1969 (USCG)
- Stricken: date unknown
- Fate: Sold on 8 November 1971

General characteristics
- Displacement: 640 tons
- Length: 184 ft 6 in (56.24 m)
- Beam: 33 ft 1 in (10.08 m)
- Draft: 9 ft 8 in (2.95 m)
- Propulsion: two 1,000 HP General Motors 12-278A diesel engines; two shafts
- Speed: max: 16 knots
- Range: cruising: 13 knots; 8,000 mile range
- Complement: 99 (1945); 39 (1966)
- Armament: 1 x 3"/50 gun mount; 3 x 40mm gun mounts; 5x 20mm gun mounts; 2 depth charge tracks; 4 x depth charge projectors; 1 x MK 10 depth charge projector (hedgehog); (1945); 1 x 3"/50; MK 10 hedgehog depth charge projector (1965).

USS Lamar (PCE-899)/USCGC Lamar (WTR-899) was a PCE-842-class patrol craft acquired by the U.S. Navy during World War II for the task of patrolling assigned ocean areas or protecting larger ships in convoy.

== Construction ==
PCR-899 was laid down as PC-899 on 11 January 1943, by Willamette Iron & Steel Corporation in Portland, Oregon. She was reclassified PCE-899 on 28 March 1943. She was launched on 11 August 1943, and was sponsored by Mrs. Opha McClimans. She was commissioned on 17 March 1945.

== World War II service ==
After shakedown along the U.S. West Coast, PCE-899 departed San Pedro, California, on 5 May for the Marianas. Steaming via Pearl Harbor and Eniwetok, she reached Guam on 12 June and began weather station patrols out of Apra Harbor. Assigned to SerForPac, she gathered weather data in an area west of the Marianas. Placed in "caretaker status" 27 June 1946 at Apra, she resumed active status on 12 September.

=== End-of-war operations ===
Resuming weather reporting patrols in waters between the Marianas and the Carolines, PCE-899 operated out of Guam until 26 August 1948 when she departed her patrol area for Pearl Harbor. Reaching Pearl Harbor 9 September, she served there for more than three months, then sailed for Guam on 22 December. She arrived 1 January 1949, made periodic patrols for five months and departed for the U.S. West Coast on 1 August. Steaming via Kwajalein and Pearl Harbor, she arrived San Diego, California, on 27 October. Five days later she headed for the U.S. East Coast, arriving Philadelphia, Pennsylvania, 25 November. PCE-899 decommissioned on 16 December 1949 and entered the Atlantic Reserve Fleet.

== Recommissioned as a training ship ==
Towed from Philadelphia to Milwaukee, Wisconsin in 1950, PCE-899 recommissioned on 13 December 1950. Assigned to the 9th Naval District, she served as a U.S. Naval Reserve training ship out of Milwaukee. For more than 13 years she provided valuable service in training and maintaining the fighting excellence of officers and men of the Naval Reserve. Renamed Lamar (PE-899) on 15 February 1956, she primarily cruised the upper Great Lakes. From 17 August 1959 to 17 October she made a training cruise that sent her via the St. Lawrence River and Nova Scotia to Newport, Rhode Island.

== Lamar converted for U.S. Coast Guard use ==
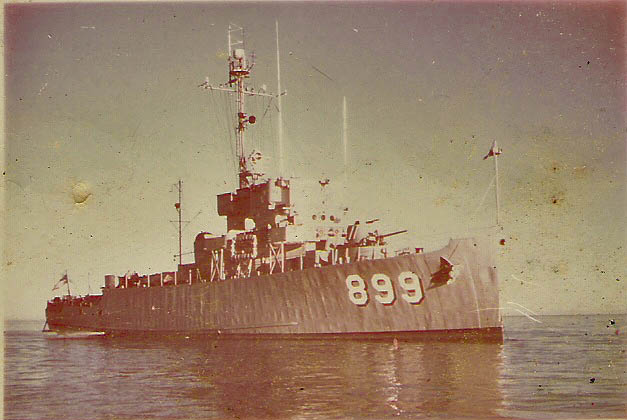
Lamar after World War II (photo taken 1963 or earlier)

Lamar completed service in the Great Lakes on 6 April 1964 and sailed to Philadelphia, arriving 28 April. She decommissioned 25 May and entered the Atlantic Reserve Fleet. Her name was struck from the Naval Register in June 1964 and transferred to the U.S. Coast Guard on 29 July 1964. She was converted for use at the Coast Guard Yard and was commissioned there on 11 September 1965. She was assigned as a reserve training vessel to Monterey, California, where she provided training for reservists from the 11th, 12th, 13th, and 14th Coast Guard Districts. Her authorized complement was 39 officers and men and she was equipped to carry 57 trainees. She was also available for limited search and rescue patrols if needed.

== Supporting the Cuban Patrol in the Straits of Florida ==
En route to Monterey, she was diverted to assist the Cuban Patrol in the Straits of Florida in October 1965 during an increase in the number of migrants leaving Cuba for Florida. She was detached from this duty and set a course for Monterey on 18 November. She arrived in Monterey on 14 December and was assigned as the training ship for the Western Districts Reserve Training program. LCDR Ernest Bizzozero, USCG, became her commanding officer on 10 June 1967.

The Coast Guard decommissioned her on 30 September 1969. On 8 November 1971 she was sold to the Foison Industries Corporation in Taiwan for $23,300.
