= USS PCE-886 =

PCE-842-class of the US Navy

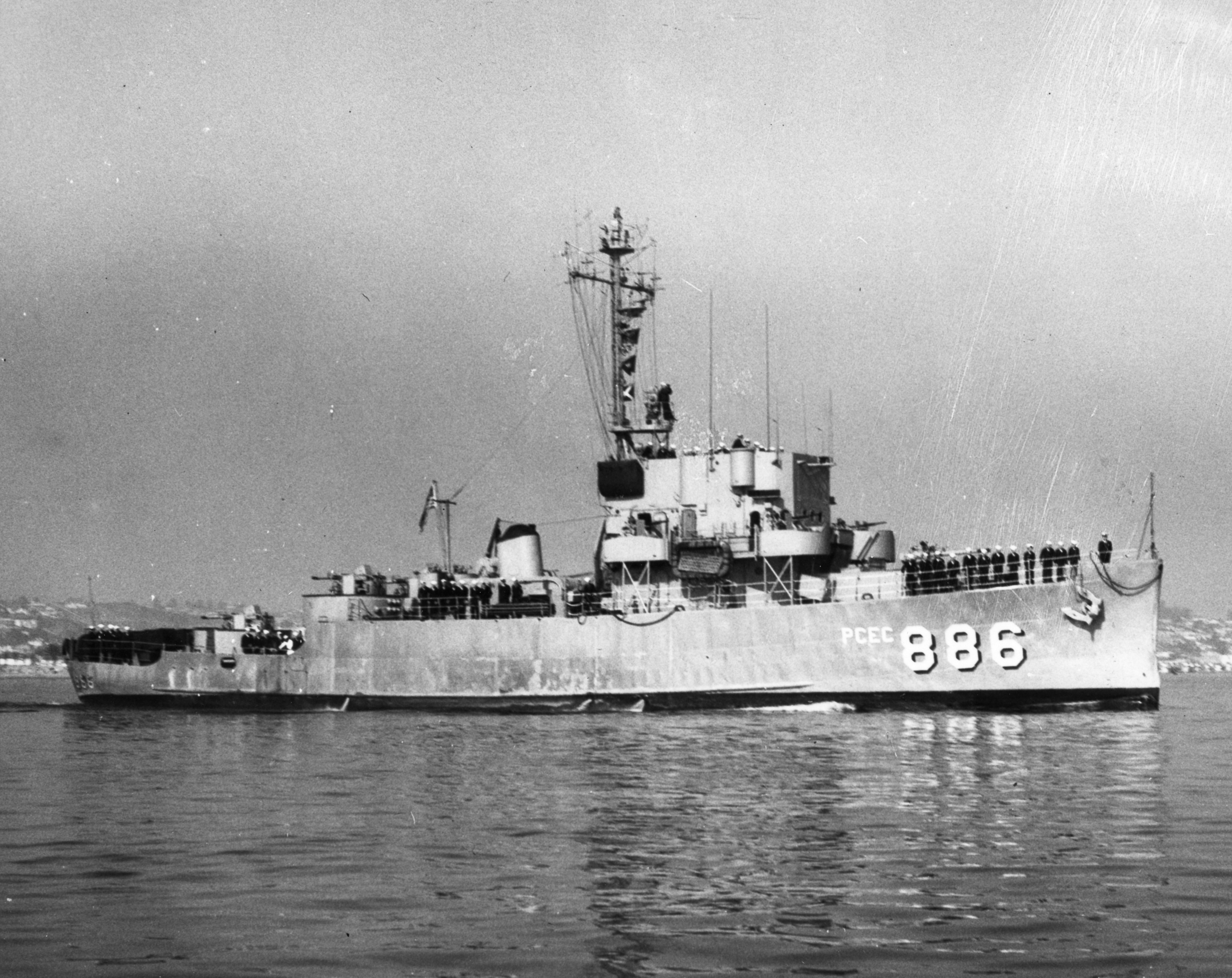
- USS Banning

History

United States
- Name: Banning
- Builder: Albina Engine & Machine Works, Portland
- Laid down: 29 March 1944
- Launched: 10 July 1944
- Commissioned: 31 May 1945
- Reclassified: PCEC-886
- Stricken: 1 May 1961
- Identification: Pennant number: PCE-886
- Fate: Sank

General characteristics
- Class & type: PCE-842-class patrol craft
- Displacement: 914 Tons (Full Load)
- Length: 184.5 ft (56.2 m)
- Beam: 33 ft (10 m)
- Draft: 9.75 ft (2.97 m)
- Installed power: 2,200 hp (1,600 kW)
- Propulsion: Main: 2 × GM 12-278A diesel engines; Auxiliary: 2 × GM 6-71 diesel engines with 100KW gen and 1 × GM 3-268A diesel engine with 60KW gen
- Speed: 16 knots (30 km/h; 18 mph) (maximum),
- Range: 6,600 nmi (12,200 km; 7,600 mi) at 11 knots (20 km/h; 13 mph)
- Complement: 79
- Armament: 1 × Mk.26 3"/50 caliber gun dual purpose gun; 3 × single Bofors 40 mm gun; 4 × Mk.10 Oerlikon 20 mm guns; 4 × M2 .50 cal (12.7 mm) machine guns

USS Banning (PCE-886) was a PCE-842-class patrol craft for the United States Navy during World War II.

== History ==
PCE-886 was laid down by Albina Engine & Machine Works, Portland on 29 March 1944 and launched on 10 July 1944. She was commissioned on 31 May 1945.

On 30 December 1949, she was part of the Pacific Reserve Fleet in Astoria. She was recommissioned on 7 September 1950 and reclassified as PCE(C)-886.

In August 1953, she was put back into her first reserve fleet group, and on 15 February 1956, she was named USS Banning.

She was struck from the naval register on 1 May 1961. From July 1961, she served as a museum ship in Hood River, Oregon. A few years later in 1969, she returned to naval custody.

In 1972, Banning was renamed Growler after being acquired by Growler, Inc. of Juneau. On 1 October 1973, she foundered in the Chukchi Sea off Cape Prince of Wales, Alaska.
