= BRP Negros Occidental =

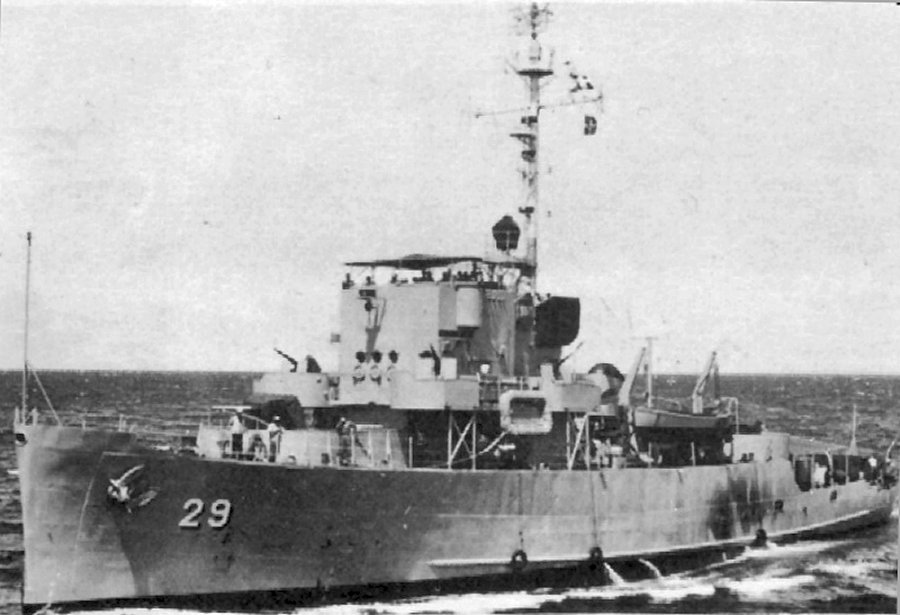
- as RPS Negros Occidental (PS-29)

History

United States
- Name: PCE-884
- Builder: Albina Engine and Machine Works, Portland, Oregon
- Laid down: 27 October 1943
- Launched: 24 February 1944
- Commissioned: 30 March 1945
- Fate: transferred to the Philippine Navy, July 1948

History

Philippines
- Name: RPS Negros Occidental (E-29)
- Namesake: Negros Occidental
- Commissioned: July 1948
- Renamed: RPS Negros Occidental (PS-29), 1965; BRP Negros Occidental (PS-29), June 1980
- Decommissioned: 9 December 2010
- Fate: hull sold for scrap in 2010

General characteristics
- Class & type: PCE-842-class patrol craft (in U.S. Navy service)
- Class & type: Miguel Malvar-class corvette (in Philippine Navy service)
- Displacement: 914 Tons (Full Load)
- Length: 184.5 ft (56.2 m)
- Beam: 33 ft (10 m)
- Draft: 9.75 ft (2.97 m)
- Installed power: 2,200 hp (1,600 kW)
- Propulsion: Main: 2 × GM 12-278A diesel engines; Auxiliary: 2 × GM 6-71 diesel engines with 100KW gen and 1 × GM 3-268A diesel engine with 60KW gen
- Speed: 16 knots (30 km/h; 18 mph) (maximum),
- Range: 6,600 nmi (12,200 km; 7,600 mi) at 11 knots (20 km/h; 13 mph)
- Complement: 85
- Sensors & processing systems: CRM-NIA-75 Surface Search Radar; RCA SPN-18 I/J-band Navigation Radar
- Armament: 1 × 3"/50-caliber gun (76 mm) Mk22 dual-purpose gun; 3 × twin Bofors 40 mm gun; 4 × Oerlikon 20 mm cannon; 4 × .50 cal (12.7 mm) machine guns

BRP Negros Occidental (PS-29) was a Miguel Malvar-class corvette of the Philippine Navy. She was originally built as USS PCE-884, a PCE-842-class patrol craft for the United States Navy during World War II. She was decommissioned from the U.S. Navy, transferred to the Philippine Navy in July 1948 and renamed Negros Occidental after the Philippine province of the same name. Along with other World War II-era ships of the Philippine Navy, Negros Occidental was considered one of the oldest active fighting ships in the world until its decommissioning.

== History ==
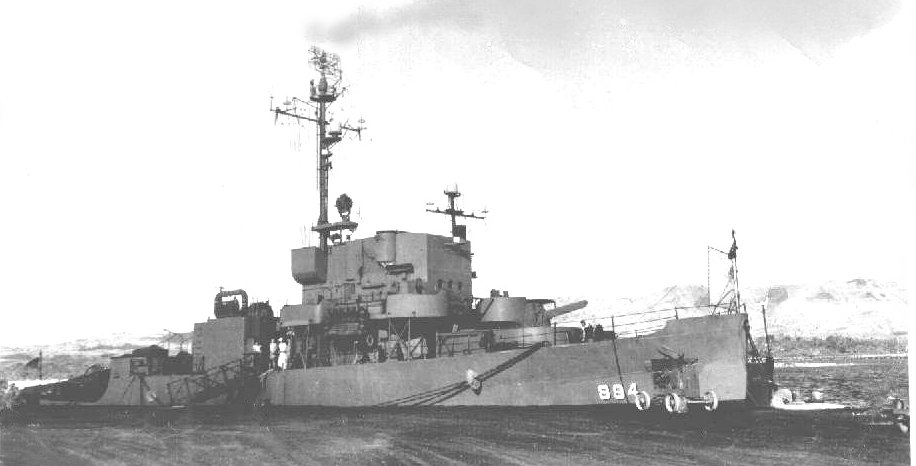
as USS PCE-884

It was commissioned in the US Navy as USS PCE-884 in 1945, and was decommissioned after World War II.

She was then transferred and commissioned into the Philippine Naval Patrol (currently Philippine Navy) and was renamed RPS Negros Occidental (E-29) in 1948. She was carried over when the PNP was renamed the Philippine Navy in 1951, and was renamed the RPS Negros Occidental (PS-29) in the mid-1960s using a new ship classification and naming system. In June 1980, all Philippine Navy ships changed their prefixes and the ship became the BRP Negros Occidental (PS-29). Her last assignment was with the Patrol Force of the Philippine Fleet. She was decommissioned from the fleet on 9 December 2010 after it was found to be beyond economical repair. She is to be sold as scrap while her equipment is removed as spare for operational sisterships.

== Technical details ==
Originally the ship was armed with one 3"/50-caliber dual-purpose gun, three twin Bofors 40 mm guns, four 20 mm Oerlikon guns, 1 Hedgehog depth charge projector, four depth charge projectiles (K-guns) and two depth charge tracks.

The same configuration applied up until the late 1980s when the Philippine Navy removed most of her old anti-submarine weapons and systems, and added four 12.7 mm general-purpose machine guns, making her lighter and ideal for surface patrols, but losing her limited anti-submarine warfare capability.

The ship is powered by two GM 12-278A diesel engines, with a combined rating of around 2,200 bhp (1,600 kW) driving two propellers. The main engines can propel the 914 tons (full load) ship to a maximum speed of around 16 knots (30 km/h).

There is a slight difference between the BRP Negros Occidental as compared to some of her sister ships in the Philippine Navy, since her previous configuration was as a patrol craft escort, while the others are configured as minesweepers and patrol craft escort rescue ships.
