= USS PCE-898 =

PCE-842-class of the US Navy

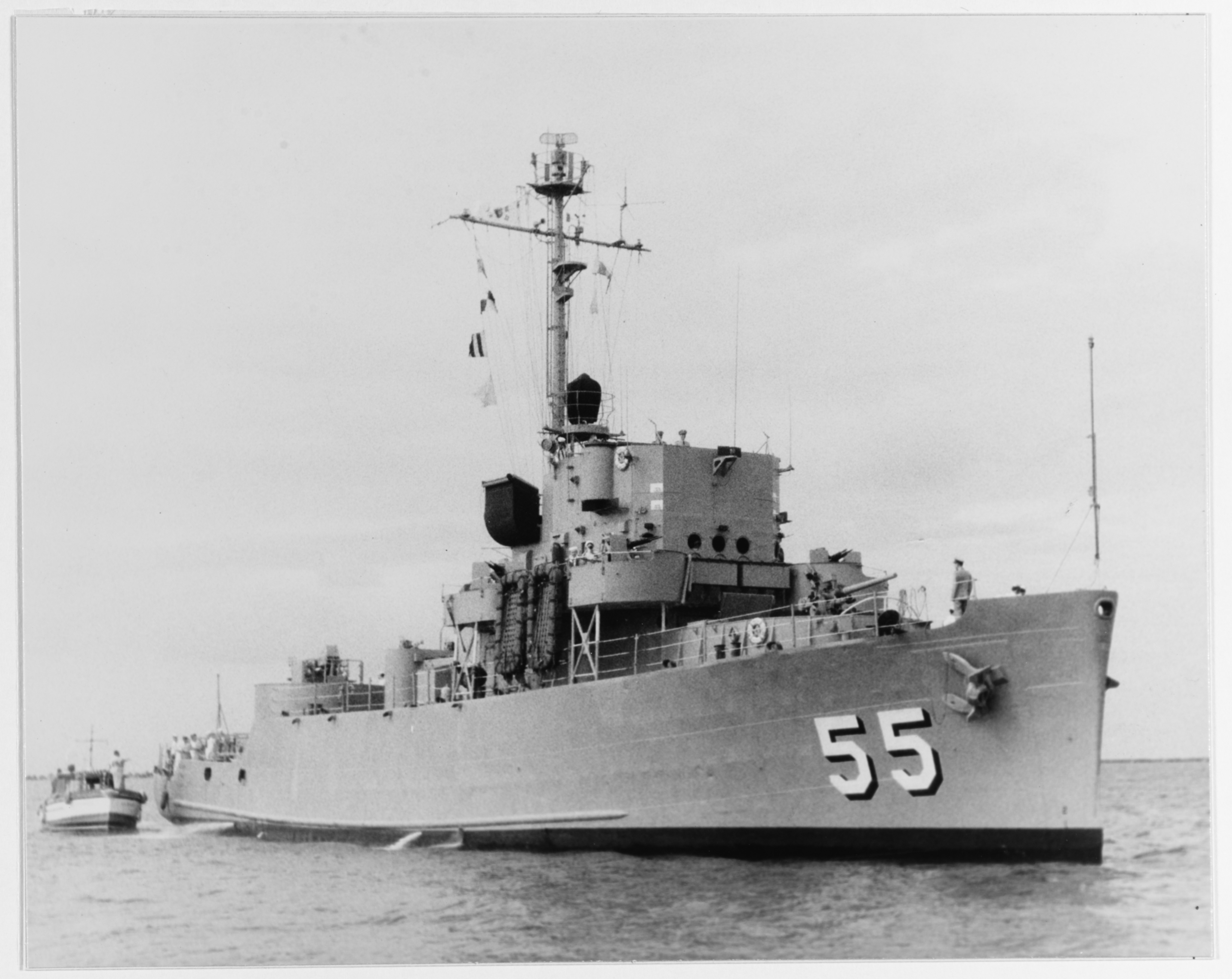
- ROKS Okpo

History

United States
- Name: PCE-898
- Builder: Willamette Iron and Steel Works, Portland
- Laid down: 16 December 1942
- Launched: 3 August 1943
- Commissioned: 24 January 1945
- Reclassified: PCEC-898
- Stricken: 15 November 1974
- Fate: Transferred to South Korean Navy, 1 November 1974

History

South Korea
- Name: Okpo
- Namesake: Okpo
- Acquired: 1 November 1974
- Commissioned: 1 November 1974
- Identification: Pennant number: PCEC 55
- Fate: Unknown

General characteristics
- Class & type: PCE-842-class patrol craft
- Displacement: 914 Tons (Full Load)
- Length: 184.5 ft (56.2 m)
- Beam: 33 ft (10 m)
- Draft: 9.75 ft (2.97 m)
- Installed power: 2,200 hp (1,600 kW)
- Propulsion: Main: 2 × GM 12-278A diesel engines; Auxiliary: 2 × GM 6-71 diesel engines with 100KW gen and 1 × GM 3-268A diesel engine with 60KW gen
- Speed: 16 knots (30 km/h; 18 mph) (maximum),
- Range: 6,600 nmi (12,200 km; 7,600 mi) at 11 knots (20 km/h; 13 mph)
- Complement: 79
- Armament: 1 × Mk.26 3"/50 caliber gun dual purpose gun; 3 × single Bofors 40 mm gun; 4 × Mk.10 Oerlikon 20 mm guns; 4 × M2 .50 cal (12.7 mm) machine guns

USS PCE-898 was a PCE-842-class patrol craft for the United States Navy during World War II. She was renamed Okpo (PCEC 55) after being acquired by the South Korean Navy on 1 November 1974.

== History ==
PCE-898 was laid down by Willamette Iron and Steel Works, Portland on 16 December 1942 and launched on 3 August 1943. She was commissioned on 24 January 1945.

After the war, she was transferred to South Korea and renamed Okpo (PCEC 55) on 1 November 1974.
