= USS Logic =

Minesweeper of the United States Navy

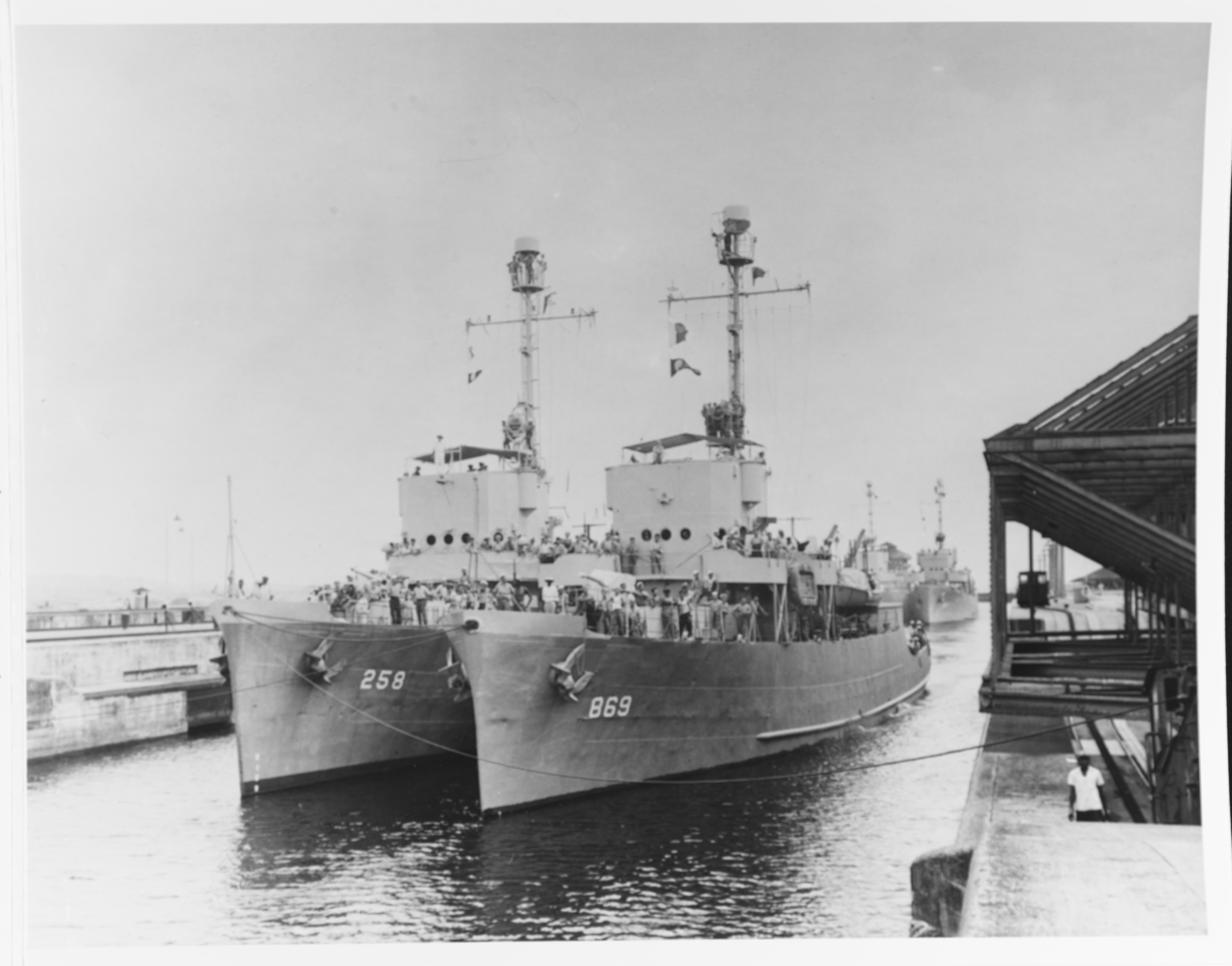
- USS Logic (left) and USS PCE-869 en route to China

History

United States
- Name: USS Logic (AM-258)
- Builder: American Ship Building Company
- Laid down: 27 October 1942
- Launched: 10 April 1943
- Commissioned: 21 November 1944
- Fate: Transferred to Republic of China, 28 August 1945

History

Taiwan
- Name: ROCS Yung Shun (AM 44)
- Acquired: 28 August 1945
- Stricken: 1 June 1970
- Fate: Unknown

General characteristics
- Class & type: Admirable-class minesweeper
- Displacement: 650 tons
- Length: 184 ft 6 in (56.24 m)
- Beam: 33 ft (10 m)
- Draft: 9 ft 9 in (2.97 m)
- Propulsion: 2 × ALCO 539 diesel engines, 1,710 shp (1.3 MW); Farrel-Birmingham single reduction gear; 2 shafts
- Speed: 14.8 knots (27.4 km/h)
- Complement: 104
- Armament: 1 × 3"/50 caliber gun DP; 2 × twin Bofors 40 mm guns; 1 × Hedgehog anti-submarine mortar; 2 × Depth charge tracks

Service record
- Part of: US Atlantic Fleet (1943-1945)

USS Logic (AM-258) was an Admirable-class minesweeper built for the U.S. Navy during World War II. Built to clear minefields in offshore waters, she served the Navy in the Atlantic Ocean.

Logic was laid down by American Shipbuilding Co., Lorain, Ohio, 27 October 1942; launched 10 April 1943; sponsored by Lt. (jg.) Mary Erbenz, USCGR; and commissioned 21 November.

== World War II North Atlantic operations ==
After a cruise through the Great Lakes, Logic engaged in shakedown exercises in Chesapeake Bay. Departing Little Creek, Virginia, 25 January 1944, the minesweeper sailed for South America, arriving Recife, Brazil, 4 March. For the next 12 months Logic operated out of Recife with Mine Division 31, sweeping the main shipping channels of South American ports. She also escorted convoys from Brazil to Trinidad, patrolled the harbor, and engaged in antisubmarine training.

Arriving Miami, Florida, 12 March 1945, Logic received an extensive overhaul before resuming minesweeping exercises in June. Throughout the summer, she operated along the U.S. East Coast, returning to Miami 15 August.

== Decommissioning ==
Logic was transferred to the Republic of China under the lend-lease program 28 August 1945 as Yung Shun (AM 44) and was reclassified A-28. She was decommissioned and struck 1 June 1970. Fate is unknown.
