= List of museum ships of the United States military =

The following is a list of museum ships of the United States military, specifically the United States Navy and the United States Coast Guard. It represents a subset of the list of museum ships comprising museum ships located worldwide.

United States Navy
Name	Country	Region	City	Nationality	Launched	Class	Type	Remarks	Ref
CCB-18	United States	California	Coronado	United States	1968		Command control boat		
USS Alabama	United States	Alabama	Mobile	United States	1942	South Dakota class (1939)	Battleship	Led the American Fleet into Tokyo Bay on September 5, 1945	
USS Albacore	United States	New Hampshire	Portsmouth	United States	1953	Albacore Class	Submarine	National Register of Historic Places	
USS Aries (PHM-5)	United States	Missouri	Gasconade	United States	1982	Pegasus	Hydrofoil		
USS Arizona	United States	Hawaii	Pearl Harbor	United States	1915	Pennsylvania class	Battleship	USS Arizona Memorial, Sunken Wreck	
USS Barry	United States	District of Columbia	Washington D.C.	United States (United States)	1955	Forrest Sherman class	Destroyer	scrapped Brownsville, Texas, 11 February 2022	
USS Batfish	United States	Oklahoma	Muskogee	United States	1943	Balao class	Submarine	Muskogee War Memorial Park	
Bauru	Brazil	Rio de Janeiro	Rio de Janeiro	United States	1943	Cannon class	Destroyer escort	USS McAnn (DE-179)	
USS Becuna	United States	Pennsylvania	Philadelphia	United States	1944	Balao class	Submarine	Independence Seaport Museum	
USS Blueback	United States	Oregon	Portland	United States	1959	Barbel class	Submarine	Oregon Museum of Science and Industry	
USS Bowfin	United States	Hawaii	Pearl Harbor	United States	1943	Balao class	Submarine	USS Bowfin Submarine and Memorial Park	
USS Cobia	United States	Wisconsin	Manitowoc	United States (United States)	1943	Gato class	Submarine	Wisconsin Maritime Museum	
USS Cairo	United States	Mississippi	Vicksburg	United States	1862	City class	Gunboat	Vicksburg National Military Park	
USS Cassin Young	United States	Massachusetts	Boston	United States	1943	Fletcher class	Destroyer	Boston National Historic Park	
USS Cavalla	United States	Texas	Galveston	United States	1943	Gato class	Submarine	Cavalla Historical Foundation, sank the Japanese aircraft carrier Shōkaku	
HS Velos	Greece	Islands	Poros	United States	1942	Fletcher class	Destroyer	USS Charrette	
USS Clamagore	United States	South Carolina	Mount Pleasant	United States	1945	Balao class	Submarine	Patriots Point Naval and Maritime Museum, scrapped 2022	
USS Cobia	United States	Wisconsin	Manitowoc	United States	1943	Gato class	Submarine	Wisconsin Maritime Museum	
USS Cod	United States	Ohio	Cleveland	United States	1943	Gato class	Submarine	U.S.S. Cod Submarine Memorial	
USS Constellation	United States	Maryland	Baltimore	United States	1854	Wooden	Sloop	U.S.S. Constellation Museum	
USS Constitution	United States	Massachusetts	Boston	United States	1797	Wooden	Frigate	U.S.S. Constitution Museum	
USS Croaker	United States	New York	Buffalo	United States	1943	Gato class	Submarine	Buffalo and Erie County Naval and Military Park	
Name	Country	Region	City	Nationality	Launched	Class	Type	Remarks	Ref
USS Dolphin	United States	California	San Diego	United States	1968	Dolphin class	Submarine	Maritime Museum of San Diego	
USS Drum	United States	Alabama	Mobile	United States	1941	Gato class	Submarine	USS Alabama Battleship Commission	
USS Edson	United States	Michigan	Bay City	United States	1958	Forrest Sherman class	Destroyer		
TCG Ege	Turkey	Aegean Region	İzmir	United States	1972	Knox class	Frigate	USS Ainsworth; at İnciraltı Sea Museum	
ROKS Jeon Ju	South Korea	Dangjin-gun	Chungnam	United States	1945	Gearing class	Destroyer	USS Rogers	
TCG Gayret	Turkey	Kocaeli Province	İzmit	United States	1946	Gearing class	Destroyer	USS Eversole	
USS Growler	United States	New York	New York City	United States	1958	Grayback class	Submarine	Intrepid Sea-Air-Space Museum	
CSS H. L. Hunley	United States	South Carolina	Charleston	Confederate States (Confederate States of America)	1863		Submarine	Warren Lasch Conservation Hall	
CSS Neuse	United States	North Carolina	Kinston	Confederate States (Confederate States of America)		Albemarle class	Ironclad ram	CSS Neuse Civil War Museum	
USS Hoga	United States	Arkansas	Little Rock	United States (United States)	1940	Woban class	District Harbor Tug	Arkansas Inland Maritime Museum	
USS Hazard	United States	Nebraska	Omaha	United States	1944	Admirable class	Minesweeper	National Historic Landmark	
USS Hornet	United States	California	Alameda	United States	1943	Essex class	Aircraft carrier	National Historic Landmark, badly damaged the aircraft carrier Zuikaku	
USS Intrepid	United States	New York	New York City	United States	1943	Essex class	Aircraft carrier	Helped to sink the Japanese battleship Musashi, the largest and most powerful battleship ever made	
USS Iowa	United States	California	San Pedro	United States	1942	Iowa class	Battleship	as of 7 July 2012	
USS Joseph P. Kennedy, Jr.	United States	Massachusetts	Fall River	United States	1945	Gearing class	Destroyer	Joseph P. Kennedy Jr.	
USS Kidd	United States	Louisiana	Baton Rouge	United States	1943	Fletcher class	Destroyer	Kamikaze	
USS Laffey	United States	South Carolina	Mount Pleasant	United States	1943	Allen M. Sumner class	Destroyer	National Historic Landmark, survived 7 Kamikazes	
USS LCI(L)-1091	United States	California	Eureka	United States	1944	LCI(L)-351 class LLC	Large Landing Craft	Humboldt Bay	
USS LCS(L)(3)-102	United States	California	Mare Island	United States	1944		Landing Craft Support	United States Navy	
USS Lexington	United States	Texas	Corpus Christi	United States	1942	Essex class	Aircraft carrier	Sank the Japanese aircraft carrier Zuikaku (the last remaining carrier that attacked Pearl Harbor, and the ship that sank Lexington's predecessor, USS Lexington (CV-2))	
USS Ling	United States	New Jersey	Hackensack	United States	1943	Balao class	Submarine	No public access (New Jersey Naval Museum defunct)	
USS Lionfish	United States	Massachusetts	Fall River	United States	1943	Balao class	Submarine		
USS Little Rock	United States	New York	Buffalo	United States	1943	Cleveland class	Light cruiser		
Name	Country	Region	City	Nationality	Launched	Class	Type	Remarks	Ref
USS LST-325	United States	Indiana	Evansville	United States	1942	LST Mk.3	Landing Ship, Tank		
USS LST-393	United States	Michigan	Muskegon	United States	1942	LST	Landing Ship, Tank	USS LST 393 Veterans Museum	
USS LST-1008	China	Shandong	Qingdao	United States	1944	LST	Tank landing ship		
USS Marlin	United States	Nebraska	Omaha	United States	1953	Mackerel class	Submarine		
USS Massachusetts	United States	Massachusetts	Fall River	United States	1941	South Dakota class (1939)	Battleship	Fought in the Naval Battle of Casablanca, where she sank or helped to sink 10 ships in total	
USS Midway	United States	California	San Diego	United States	1945	Midway class	Aircraft carrier		
USS Missouri	United States	Hawaii	Pearl Harbor	United States	1944	Iowa class	Battleship	Japanese surrender	
Nash (harbor tug)	United States	New York	Oswego	United States	1943		Tugboat	(Army tug) Participated in the Normandy landings	
USS Nautilus	United States	Connecticut	Groton	United States	1954	Nuclear-powered	Submarine	North Pole	
USS New Jersey	United States	New Jersey	Camden	United States	1942	Iowa class	Battleship	New Jersey	
USS North Carolina	United States	North Carolina	Wilmington	United States	1940	North Carolina class	Battleship		
USS Olympia	United States	Pennsylvania	Philadelphia	United States	1892	Steel-hulled	Protected cruiser	Commodore Dewey's flagship, Independence Seaport Museum, served as the flagship at the naval Battle of Manila Bay	
USS Orleck	United States	Florida	Jacksonville	United States	1945	Gearing class	Destroyer		
USS Pampanito	United States	California	San Francisco	United States	1943	Balao class	Submarine	National Historic Landmark	
USS Philadelphia	United States	District of Columbia	Washington, D.C.	United States	1776		Gunboat	Battle of Valcour Island	
TCG Pirireis	Turkey	Aegean Region	İzmir	United States	1951	Tang class	Submarine	USS Tang; at İnciraltı Sea Museum	
USS Potomac	United States	California	Oakland (Jack London Square)	United States	1934	Presidential	Yacht	Franklin D. Roosevelt	
PTF-26	United States	Illinois	Golconda	United States	1968	Osprey class	Fast Patrol Boat	Deployed to Vietnam 1968–69. Sea Scout Ship with all-female crew 1998–2020. Relocated as 1st maritime training ship on Ohio River Jan 2024.	
USS Pueblo	North Korea	South Pyongan	Pyongyang	United States	1944	Banner class	Technical research ship		
USS Razorback	United States	Arkansas	Little Rock	United States	1944	Balao class	Submarine		
USS Requin	United States	Pennsylvania	Pittsburgh	United States	1945	Tench class	Submarine		
Name	Country	Region	City	Nationality	Launched	Class	Type	Remarks	Ref
USS Salem	United States	Massachusetts	Quincy	United States	1943	Des Moines class	Heavy cruiser		
USS Silversides	United States	Michigan	Muskegon	United States	1941	Gato class	Submarine		
USS Slater	United States	New York	Albany	United States	1944	Cannon class	Destroyer escort		
USS Stewart	United States	Texas	Galveston	United States	1942	Edsall class	Destroyer escort	Seawolf Park	
ROKS Taedong	South Korea			United States	1943	Tacoma class	Frigate	USS Tacoma	
ROCS Te Yang	Republic of China (Taiwan)	Tainan	Tainan City	United States	1945	Gearing class	Destroyer	USS Sarsfield	
USS Texas	United States	Texas	Galveston	United States	1910	New York class	Battleship	Flooded herself to aim farther during shore bombardment at the Normandy landings. As of 2023 she is in drydock in Galveston. Future homeport to be decided.	
USS The Sullivans	United States	New York	Buffalo	United States	1943	Fletcher class	Destroyer	Buffalo and Erie County Naval and Military Park	
USS Torsk	United States	Maryland	Baltimore	United States	1944	Tench class	Submarine	Baltimore Maritime Museum	
USS Turner Joy	United States	Washington	Bremerton	United States	1958	Forrest Sherman class	Destroyer	Gulf of Tonkin Incident	
TCG Uluçalireis	Turkey	Istanbul Province	Istanbul	United States	1944	Tench class	Submarine	USS Thornback	
USS Utah	United States	Hawaii	Pearl Harbor	United States (United States)	1909	Florida-class battleship	Battleship	USS Utah Memorial, Sunken wreck	
USS Washtenaw County	United States	Oregon	Rainier	United States	1952	LST	Landing Ship, Tank	Preservation status on hold	
USS Wisconsin	United States	Virginia	Norfolk	United States	1943	Iowa class	Battleship		
USS Yorktown	United States	South Carolina	Mount Pleasant	United States	1943	Essex class	Aircraft carrier		
Trieste	United States	District of Columbia	Washington, D.C.	Italy	1953		Bathyscaphe	Naval Historical Center	
Trieste II (DSV-1)	United States	Washington	Keyport	United States	1969		Bathyscaphe	Naval Undersea Museum	
HA. 19	United States	Texas	Fredericksburg	Japan	1941	Ko-hyoteki class	Midget submarine	Pearl Harbor	
U-505	United States	Illinois	Chicago	Nazi Germany	1941	Type IXC	Submarine	Captured in 1944, sank 7 ships and survived a 250-pound bomb	
Name	Country	Region	City	Nationality	Launched	Class	Type	Remarks	Ref
SS American Victory	United States	Florida	Tampa	United States	1945	Victory Ship	Cargo Ship	National Register of Historic Places	
RV Ben Franklin	Canada	British Columbia	Vancouver	United States	1966	Research vessel	Submarine	Vancouver Maritime Museum	
SS Hellas Liberty	Greece	Pireus	Pireus	United States	1943	Liberty ship	Cargo Ship		
SS Jeremiah O'Brien	United States	California	San Francisco	United States	1943	Liberty ship	Cargo Ship		
SS John W. Brown	United States	Maryland	Baltimore	United States	1942	Liberty ship	Cargo Ship		
SS Lane Victory	United States	California	San Pedro	United States	1945	Victory Ship	Cargo Ship	U.S. Merchant Marine	
SS Red Oak Victory	United States	California	Richmond	United States	1944	Victory Ship	Cargo Ship		
PT 309	United States	Texas	Fredericksburg	United States	1944	78' Higgins Type	PT Boat		
PT 617	United States	Massachusetts	Fall River	United States	1945	80' Elco Type	PT Boat		
PT 658	United States	Oregon	Portland, Oregon	United States	1945	78' Higgins Type	PT Boat		
PT 796	United States	Massachusetts	Fall River	United States	1945	78' Higgins Type	PT Boat		
United States Coast Guard
Name	Country	Region	City	Nationality	Launched	Class	Type	Remarks	Links
USCGC Lilac	United States	New York	New York	United States (United States)	1933	Violet	Buoy Tender	Last steam powered Buoy Tender in US	
CG-41410	United States	Wisconsin	Sturgeon Bay	United States	1977	41 UTB class	Utility Boat		
CG-44404	United States	New Jersey	Cape May	United States (United States)	1972	44 MLB class	Motor Life Boat		
Brilliant	United States	Connecticut	Mystic	United States	1932		Auxiliary schooner		
USCGC Acacia	United States	Michigan	Manistee	United States	1944	Class C (Iris)	USCG seagoing buoy tender		
USCGC Alert	United States	Washington	Seattle	United States	1927	Active class	Patrol Boat		
USCGC Bramble	United States	Michigan	Port Huron	United States	1943	Class C (Iris)	Cutter/Buoy tender		
USCGC Comanche	United States	Washington	Tacoma	United States	1944	ATA-170 class	Fleet Tug		
USCGC Ingham	United States	Florida	Key West	United States	1936	Treasury class	Cutter		
USCGC Mackinaw	United States	Michigan	Mackinaw City	United States	1943	Wind class	Icebreaker		
USCGC McLane	United States	Michigan	Muskegon	United States	1927	Active class	Patrol Boat	Scraped January 2026	
USCGC Morris	United States	Texas		United States	1927	Active class	Patrol Boat		
USCGC Sundew	United States	Minnesota	Duluth	United States	1942	USCG Seagoing Buoy Tender	Cutter	Sold to private interests in 2010	
USCGC Taney	United States	Maryland	Baltimore	United States	1935	Treasury class	Cutter	Pearl Harbor attack	
CG 36500	United States	Massachusetts	Orleans	United States	1946	36-foot lifeboat	Lifeboat		
Lightship Ambrose	United States	New York	New York	United States	1907	LV-87	Lightvessel	South Street Seaport	
Lightship Barnegat	United States	New Jersey	Camden	United States	1904	LV 79/WAL 506	Lightvessel	Formerly Chesapeake Bay Maritime Museum and Penn's Landing. Currently Pyne Poynt Marina.	
Lightship Columbia	United States	Oregon	Astoria	United States (United States)	1951	WLV-604	Lightvessel	List of lightvessel museums in the United States	
Lightship Huron	United States	Michigan	Port Huron	United States	1920	LV-103	Lightvessel	List of lightvessel museums in the United States	
Lightship Chesapeake	United States	Maryland	Baltimore	United States	1930	LV-116	Lightvessel	List of lightvessel museums in the United States	
Lightship Nantucket	United States	Massachusetts	East Boston,	United States	1936	LV-112	Lightvessel	RMS Olympic; List of lightvessel museums in the United States	
Lightship Frying-Pan	United States	New York	New York	United States	1929	LV-115	Lightvessel		
Lightship Portsmouth	United States	Virginia	Portsmouth	United States	1915	LV-101	Lightvessel	List of lightvessel museums in the United States	
Lightship Swiftsure	United States	Washington	Seattle	United States (United States)	1904	LV-83	Lightvessel		

== See also ==
- List of museum ships
- List of museum ships in North America
- List of current ships of the United States Navy
- Equipment of the United States Coast Guard
- List of submarine museums
