= Pollock Rip Lightship =

A number of vessels served as the Pollock Rip Lightship first located to mark the junction of Pollock Rip and Pollock Rip Slue channels. The area was heavily used and subject to heavy fog. The station itself changed within the locality. From 1889 to 1913 the red hull was marked in white with Pollock Rip and then simply Pollock from 1913 to 1969. A nearby station, occupied from 1902 to 1923 by Lightship No. 73 before it was assigned to Pollock Rip station in 1923, was marked Pollock Rip Slue. The station was not occupied between February 16 and October 16, 1924 and was replaced by a buoy 1942 — 1945.

In addition to the light the vessels were equipped with fog bells, horns, guns and sirens over the 120 years of operation. In addition to the surface acoustic signals the station was equipped between 1910 and 1930 with a coded submarine signal bell. In 1928 the vessels were equipped with a radio beacon coded -..- for recognition.

- Lightship No. 2 (1849 - 1875)
- Lightship No. 40 (1875 - 1877)
- Lightship No. 42 (1877 - 1892)
- Lightship No. 47 (1892 - 1923)
- Lightship No. 73 (1923 - 1924)
- Lightship No. 110 (1924 - 1942)
- Buoy (1942 — 1945)
- Lightship No. 110 (1945 - 1947)
- Lightship No. WLV 196 (1947 - 1958)
- Lightship No. 114 (1958 – 1969)

== See also ==
- List of lightships of the United States
