= United States lightship Nantucket (LV-58) =

History

United States
- Name: Nantucket Lightship LV58
- Operator: United States Lighthouse Board
- Builder: Craig Shipbuilding
- Cost: $50,870; ($1,848,733 in modern dollars)
- Launched: 1894
- In service: 1894
- Out of service: December 11, 1905
- Nickname(s): Relief (lv-58)
- Fate: Sunk

General characteristics
- Type: Lightvessel
- Tonnage: 449 gross
- Length: 121 ft 10 in (37.13 m)
- Beam: 28 ft 6 in (8.69 m)
- Draught: 12 ft 0 in (3.66 m)
- Crew: 13 sailors

The Nantucket Lightship LV58 was a lightvessel of the United States Lighthouse Board from 1894 to 1905. During those years, she primarily served the coast of Fire Island in New York and the Nantucket Shoals, though she was a relief vessel and served as needed in other locations off the northeast coast as well. From 1898 to her sinking in 1905, she was occasionally used as a lighthouse tender.

In the course of her brief career, LV58 suffered two accidents. On July 19, 1904, she was rammed by a steamer while relieving Pollock Rip Lightship LV47. The second accident was more severe. On December 10, 1905, LV58 was sent to relieve Nantucket Lightship LV66 during a storm. Due to a leak in the fire-room, and a subsequent failure of suction pumps, the boilers became flooded. A distress signal was sent and the crew was forced to bail out water by hand for 24 hours before Captain Charles I. Gibbs and USLHT Azalea arrived to tow them in for repairs. After four hours of towing, the crew was forced to abandon ship and she went down 18 miles (29 km) off the coast of Nantucket.

The fallout of this incident caused a small public uproar. Under Navy rules, the eleven officers and crew members of LV58 were denied pay while they were recovering from their injuries and until they were posted to new vessels. This situation was appealed to Captain Uriel Sebree, who served as head of the Lighthouse Board at the time, but he did not or was not able to accommodate the situation. Instead, the officers would be given commendations by Secretary Victor H. Metcalf and "preference in future appointments" only. Admiral George Dewey and Sebree also made a recommendation, which was approved, that Captain Gibbs receive a commendation and a pay increase for his service.

This incident marked in the first time in US naval history that a distress message was transmitted by radio. LV58 had one of the first Marconi radios installed for testing in 1901 and it was brought into full-time use in 1904.
