= List of lightships of the United States =

This is a list of lightships of the United States, listing lightships operated by the United States government. The first US lightship was put in place off of Willoughby Spit in Chesapeake Bay, Virginia, in 1820. Lightships remained in service in the United States until March 29, 1985, when the last ship, the Nantucket I, was decommissioned. During that period, lightships were operated by several branches of the government: by the Lighthouse Establishment from 1820 to 1852, the Lighthouse Board from 1852 to 1910, the Lighthouse Service from 1910 to 1939, and the Coast Guard from 1939 to 1985.

The naming conventions used for lightships are not consistent. Until 1867, there was no uniform method to refer to individual lightships. Lightships in that period generally took the name of the station that they served, but occasionally other names. These names were not permanently assigned to an individual vessel. Rather, whenever a lightship was moved to a new station she took on that name. That made identifying individual ships nearly impossible. Beginning in 1867, lightship numbers (hull numbers) were assigned to ships still in service. These numbers are the primary means of identifying individual lightships across her various stations. In 1938, the Lighthouse Service retroactively allocated letter codes to the unnumbered lightships based on their research of available records, although some ships may have been lost or misidentified. Even with the hull numbers, it is common to refer to a lightship by the name of the station it serves (or Relief, if it is a relief ship) and a few, such as the Nantucket I and Nantucket II, have been given individual names.

== Lightships ==
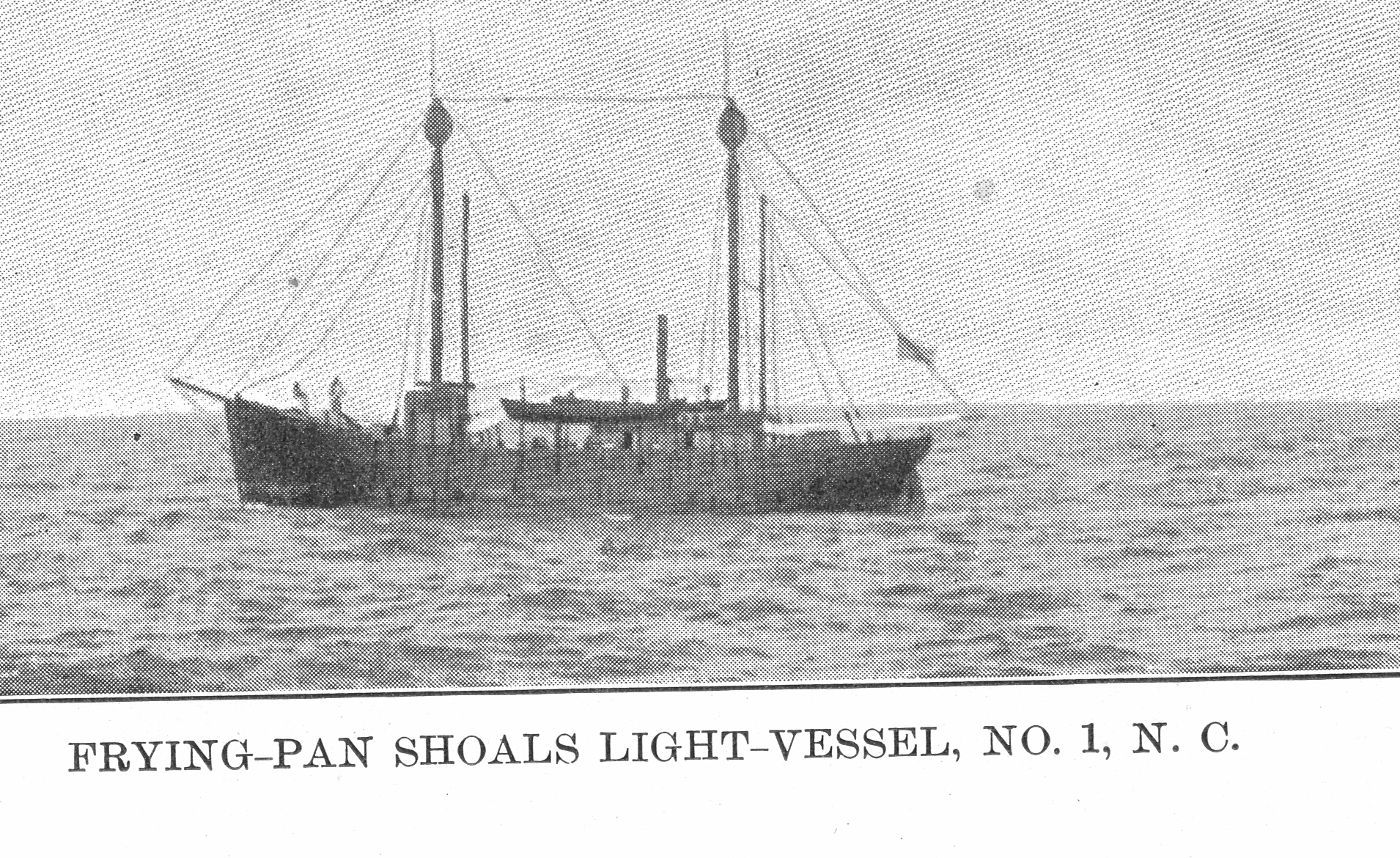
Lightship LV-1 in 1907

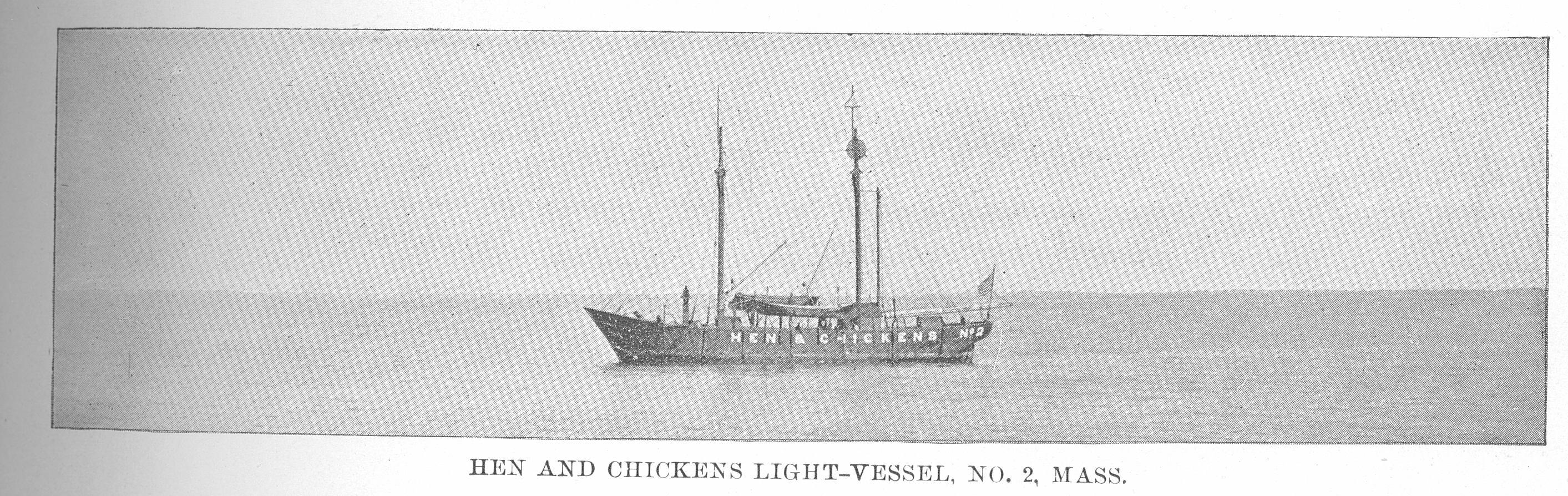
Lightship LV-2, c.1900

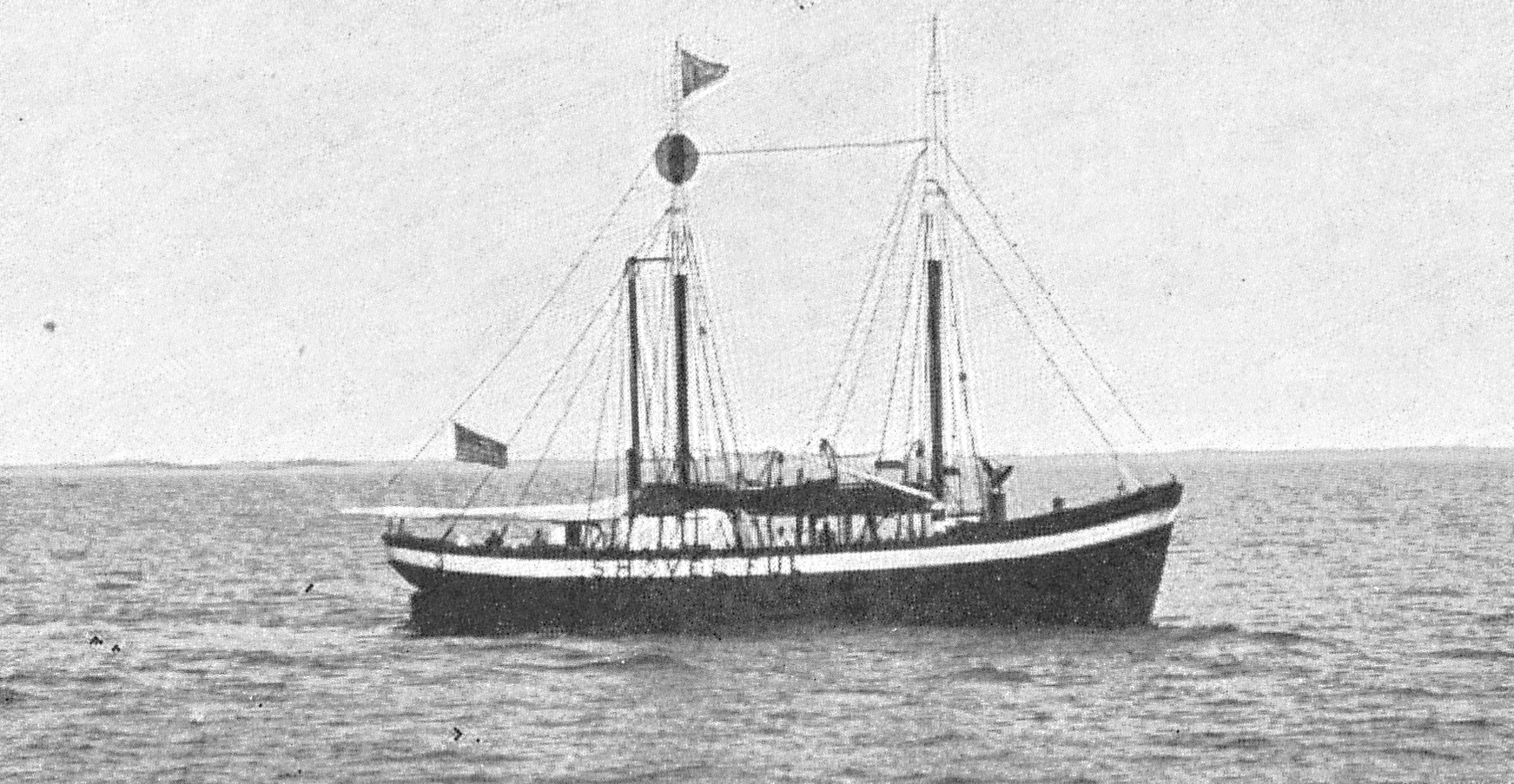
Lightship LV-3 in 1907

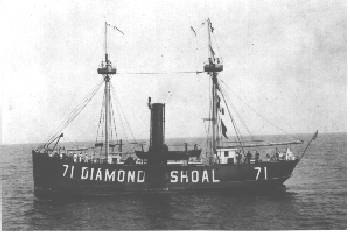
Lightship LV-71, c.1910

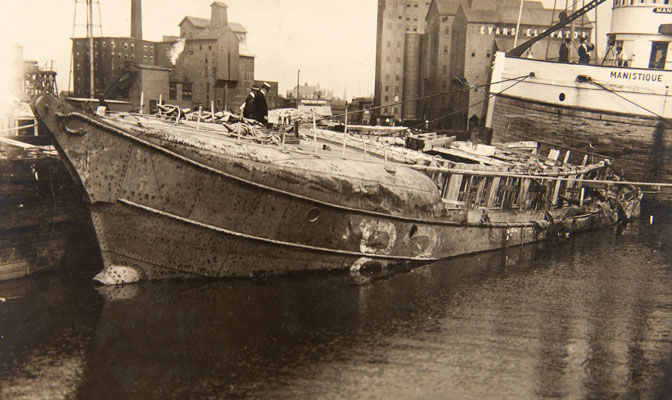
Lightship LV-82, c.1915 after being raised

Designation		Start year		End year	Stations	Fate	
Lightship A	c.	1838	c.	1868	St. Helena Bar (1838 – 1859); Combahee Bank (1859–1868)	Unknown	^{[A]}
Lightship B		1821		1861	Smith Point (1821 – 1861)	Sunk by the Confederate States Navy in 1861	^{[A]}
Lightship C		1820	c.	1859	Willoughby's Spit (1820); Craney Island (1821 – 1859)	Unknown	^{[A]}
Lightship D	c.	1854	c.	1860	Frying Pan Shoal (1854 – 1860)	Sunk or captured by the Confederate States Navy	^{[A]}
Lightship E	c.	1854	c.	1860	Rattlesnake Shoal (1854 – 1860)	Sunk or captured by the Confederate States Navy	^{[A]}
Lightship F	c.	1849	after	1860	Ship Shoal (1849 – 1859); Relief (1860 – Unknown)	Unknown	^{[A]}
Lightship G	c.	1865		1866	Cross Rip (1865 – 1866)	Abandoned and sunk by December 30, 1866	^{[A]}
Lightship H	c.	1828		1864	Cross Rip (1828 – 1864)	Wrecked at Cape Poge, Martha's Vineyard in 1864	^{[A]}
Lightship K	c.	1839	c.	1859	Martins Industry (1839 – 1855); Calibouge Sound (1855 – 1859)	Unknown	^{[A]}
Lightship L	c.	1835	after	1849	Bartlett Reef (1835 – 1849); Eel Grass Shoal (1849 – Unknown)	Unknown	^{[A]}
Lightship M	c.	1826	c.	1855	Wade Point Shoal (1826 – 1855)	Unknown	^{[A]}
Lightship N		1823	c.	1855	Brandywine Shoal (1823 – 1850); Minots Ledge (1851 – 1854); Relief (1855)	Unknown	^{[A]}
Lightship O	c.	1835		1861	Bowlers Rock (1835 – 1861)	Sunk or captured by the Confederate States Navy	^{[A]}
Lightship P	c.	1848	after	1848	Tybee Island Knoll (1848 – Unknown)	Unknown	^{[A]}
Lightship Q		1821	c.	1847	Willoughby's Spit (1821 – 1847)	Unknown	^{[A]}
Lightship R		1847		1867	Willoughby's Spit (1847 – 1867)	Unknown	^{[A]}
Lightship S		1821	after	1821	Wolf Trap Shoal (1821 – Unknown)	Unknown	^{[A]}
Lightship T		1856		1861	Wolf Trap / York Spit (1856 – 1861)	Sunk or captured by the Confederate States Navy in 1861	^{[A]}
Lightship U	c.	1834		1861	Windmill Point (1834 – 1861)	Sunk or captured by the Confederate States Navy in 1861	^{[A]}
Lightship V	c.	1863		1864	Fishing Rip (1863 – 1864)	Captured during the American Civil War, and commandeered by the United States Navy from July 5, 1863 to March 1864. It is unknown what became of it after the war.	^{[A]}
Lightship W	c.	1847		1860	Merrills Shell Bank (1847 – 1860)	Sunk by the Confederate States Navy in 1860	^{[A]}
Lightship X		1823	c.	1845	Upper Middle Shoal (1823 – 1845)	May be Lightship LV-19, which was sunk in 1900	^{[A]}
Lightship Y	c.	1857	c.	1861	Dames Point (1857 – 1861)	Unknown	^{[A]}
Lightship Z		1847	c.	1860	Vineyard Sound (1847 – 1860)	Unknown	^{[A]}
Lightship AA	c.	1825	c.	1841	Carysfort Reef (1825 – 1841)	May have been converted to a bell boat in 1841, but may have been two ships. (The first retired in 1830.)	^{[A]}
Lightship BB	c.	1841	c.	1852	Carysfort Reef (1841 – 1841)	Unknown	^{[A]}
Lightship DD	c.	1825		1861	Lower Cedar Point (1825 – 1861)	Sunk or captured by the Confederate States Navy in 1861	^{[A]}
Lightship EE	before	1859	c.	1859	Upper Cedar Point (unknown – 1859)	Unknown	^{[A]}
Lightship FF	c.	1831	after	1831	Brant Island Shoal (1831 – Unknown)	Unknown	^{[A]}
Lightship GG	c.	1863	c.	1863	Brant Island Shoal (1863)	Unknown	^{[A]}
Lightship HH	c.	1828	c.	1862	Neuse River (1828 – 1862)	Unknown	^{[A]}
Lightship JJ	c.	1825		1861	Long Shoal (1825 – 1861)	Sunk or captured by the Confederate States Navy in 1861	^{[A]}
Lightship KK	c.	1864	c.	1867	Long Shoal (1864 – 1867)	Unknown	^{[A]}
Lightship LL	c.	1821	after	1821	Upper Cedar Point (1821 – Unknown)	Unknown	^{[A]}
Lightship MM	c.	1835		1861	Roanoke River (1835 – 1861)	Sunk or captured by the Confederate States Navy in 1861	^{[A]}
Lightship NN	c.	1838	c.	1854	Northwest Passage (1838 – 1854)	Unknown	^{[A]}
Lightship PP	c.	1846	c.	1853	Sand Key (1846 – 1853)	Unknown	^{[A]}
Lightship QQ	c.	1836		1861	Harbor Island (1836 – 1861)	Sunk or captured by the Confederate States Navy in 1861	^{[A]}
Lightship RR	c.	1835	c.	1861	Roanoke Island (1835 – 1861)	Unknown	^{[A]}
Lightship SS	c.	1827		1861	Nine Foot Shoal (1827 – 1859); Upper Cedar Point (1859 – 1861)	Sunk or captured by the Confederate States Navy in 1861	^{[A]}
Lightship TT	c.	1852	c.	1859	Okracoke Channel (1852 – 1859)	Unknown	^{[A]}
Lightship UU	c.	1851	c.	1870	Horseshoe Shoal (1851 – 1870)	Unknown	^{[A]}
Lightship VV		1823	c.	1829	Sandy Hook (1823 – 1829)	Unknown	^{[A]}
Lightship WW		1839	c.	1854	Sandy Hook (1839 – 1854)	Unknown	^{[A]}
Lightship XX		1849	c.	1870	Galveston (1849 – c. 1870)	Unknown	^{[A]}
Lightship YY		1832	c.	1851	Mackinaw Straight (1832 – 1851)	Unknown	^{[A]}
Lightship ZZ		1820	c.	1823	Northeast Pass (1820 – 1823)	Unknown	^{[A]}
Lightship LV-1		1856		1930	Nantucket New South Shoal (1856 – 1892); Martins Industry (1892 – 1896); Frying Pan Shoal (1896 – 1911); Martins Industry (1911 – 1922); Savannah (1922 – 1930)	Donated to the Sea Scouts in 1930. Later ran aground on the banks of the Merrimack River in a flood in 1936.	^{[B]}
Lightship LV-2		1849		1921	Pollock Rip (1849 – 1875); Winter Quarter Shoal (1875 – 1876); Hen and Chickens (1877 – 1907); Relief (1907 – 1921)	Unknown	^{[B]}
Lightship LV-3		1852		1923	Shovelful Shoal (1852 – 1916); Relief (1916); Handkerchief Shoal (1916 – 1923)	Unknown	^{[B]}
Lightship LV-4		1856		1924	Bishop and Clerks (1856 – 1858); Handkerchief Shoal (1858 – 1916); Relief (1916 – 1924)	Unknown	^{[B]}
Lightship LV-5		1866		1930	Hen and Chickens (1866 – 1867); Cross Rip (1867 – 1915); Relief (1916); Stonehorse Shoal (1916 – 1923); Handkerchief Shoal (1923 – 1924); Relief (1925 – 1930)	Unknown	^{[B]}
Lightship LV-6		1862		1918	Succonnesset Shoal (1862 – 1912); Relief (1912 – 1915); Cross Rip (1915 – 1918)	Disappeared on February 4, 1918. LV-6 was stuck in moving ice, and presumably sank with all hands.	^{[B]}
Lightship LV-7		1854		1909	Minots Ledge (1854 – 1860); Vineyard Sound (1861 – 1875); Relief (1875 – 1881); Wreck of Scotland (1881 – 1902); Relief (1902 – 1909)	Unknown	^{[B]}
Lightship LV-8		1860		1879	Frying Pan Shoal (1860); Han and Chickens (1867 – 1877); Relief (1877 – 1879)	Sunk by the Confederate States Navy in 1860 at Cape Fear River. LV-8 was later salvaged by USLHT Iris in 1866, and repaired. It is unknown what became of this ship.	^{[B]}
Lightship LV-9		1858		1925	Relief (1858–1915); Hedge Fence (1915–1925)	Unknown	^{[B]}
Lightship LV-10		1887		1902	Grosse Pointe (1887–1902)	LV-10 was originally purchased as a construction barge for the Lighthouse Service, then was converted to a lightship in 1887. It is unknown what became of this ship after it left service.	
Lightship LV-11		1854		1925	Nantucket New South Shoal (1854–1855); Brenton Reef (1856–1897); Relief (1897–1902); Scotland (1902–1925)	Unknown	^{[B]}
Lightship LV-12	c.	1835		1871	Eel Grass Shoal (unknown–1871)	Unknown	^{[C]}
Lightship LV-13		1854		1913	Relief (1854 – 1855); Succonnessett Shoal (1855 – 1862); Relief (1862 – 1867); Bartlett Reef (1867 – 1933); Relief (1933 – 1934)	Unknown	^{[B]}
Lightship LV-14		1853		1872	Brenton Reef (1853 – 1856); Cornfield Point (1856 – 1872); Relief (1872)	Unknown	^{[B]}
Lightship LV-15		1838		1879	Stratford Shoal (1837 – 1877); Relief (1877 – 1879)	LV-15 was replaced by Stratford Shoal Light in 1877, then was used as a barracks for workers building the Great Beds Light in 1880. She was sold at the end of that year at auction for $1,010. It is unknown what became of this ship after the auction.	^{[B]}
Lightship LV-16		1854		1935	Sandy Hook (1854 – 1891); Relief (1891 – 1935)	Unknown	^{[B]}
Lightship LV-17		1848		1891	Bartlett Reef (1848 – 1867); Relief (1867 – 1877); Eel Grass Shoal (1877 – 1882); Relief (1882 – 1891)	Transferred to US Navy in 1891 for use as target practice, and sunk later that year.	^{[B]}
Lightship LV-18		1839		1875	Five Fathom Bank (1839 – 1869); Relief (1869 – 1875)	Transferred to US Navy in 1875 for use as target practice, presumably sunk.	^{[B]}
Lightship LV-19	c.	1845		1900	Cross Ledge (1845 – 1875); Fourteen Foot Bank (1876 – 1886); Ram Island Reef (1886 – 1894); Relief (1894 – 1900)	May be the same ship as Lightship X. LV-19 was transferred to US Navy in 1900 for use as target practice, and presumably sank.	^{[B]}
Lightship LV-20		1867		1923	Relief (1867 – 1868); Wreck of Scotland (1868 – 1870); Relief (1870 – 1876); Wreck of Scotland (1876 – 1880); Relief (1880 – 1886); Wreck of Oregon (1886); Relief (1886 – 1918); Cross Rip (1918 – 1922); Relief (1923)	Sold in 1923 and used by rumrunners during Prohibition. She was eventually grounded, abandoned, and burned near Plymouth, Massachusetts.	^{[B]}
Lightship LV-21		1864		1880	Upper Cedar Point (1864 – 1867); Willoughby Split (1867 – 1868); Relief (1869 – 1871); Wreck of Weehawken (1871 – 1872); Tybee Island Knoll (1872 – 1880)	Unknown	^{[B]}
Lightship LV-22	c.	1846		1903	Relief (1846–Unknown); York Split (1863–1864); Wolf Trap Shoal (1864–1870); Eel Grass Shoal (1871–1872); Cornfield Point (1872–1882); Relief (1884–1885); Hog Island Shoal (1885–1901); Relief (1901–1903)	This was the only lightship to be renumbered (see note C). It is unknown what became of LV-22.	^{[C]}
Lightship LV-23		1862		1925	Smith Point (1862 – 1868); Willoughby Split (1868 – 1872); Relief (1872 – 1874); Wreck of Scotland (1874 – 1876); Relief (1876 – 1882); Cornfield Point (1882 – 1892); Relief (1892 – 1894); Ram Island Reef (1894 – 1925)	Originally A. J. W. Applegarth, she was acquired by the Lightship Service in 1862. It is unknown what became of this ship after she left service.	^{[B]}
Lightship LV-24		1864		1869	Lower Cedar Point (1864 – 1867); York Spit (1867 – 1870); Relief (1870 – 1874); Winter Quarter Shoal (1874 – 1875); Relief (1875 – 1889)	Unknown	^{[B]}
Lightship LV-25		1827		1884	Hooper Straight (1827 – 1867); Relief (1867 – 1870); Choptank River entrance (1870 – 1871); Eel Grass Shoal (1872 – 1877); Relief (1877 – 1884)	Unknown	^{[B]}
Lightship LV-28		1864		1906	Bowlers Rock (1864 – 1868); Relief (1868 – 1869); Galveston (1870 – 1906)	Unknown	^{[B]}
Lightship LV-29		1865		1915	Frying Pan Shoal (1865 – 1871); Martins Industry (1871 – 1875); Frying Pan Shoal (1875 – 1877); Relief (1877 – 1880); Martins Industry (1880 – 1887); Relief (1887 – 1888); Frying Pan Shoal (1888 – 1892); Relief (1893 – 1906); Martins Industry (1906 – 1911); Relief (1911 – 1915)	Unknown	^{[B]}
Lightship LV-30		1863		1871	Rattlesnake Shoal (1863 – 1871)	Unknown	^{[B]}
Lightship LV-31		1865		1871	Wreck of Weehawken (1865 – 1871)	Formerly James Gray, commissioned in the Confederate States Navy as CSS Lady Davis. Captured by the USN in 1865, stripped, and transferred into lightship service. LV-31 served until 1871 after which her fate is unknown.	^{[B]}
Lightship LV-32		1863		1890	Frying Pan Shoal (1863 – 1864); Martins Industry (1864 – 1871); Relief (1871 – 1877); Frying Pan Shoal (1877 – 1883); Relief (1883 – 1886); Rattlesnake Shoal (1886 – 1889); Relief (1889 – 1890)	Unknown	^{[B]}
Lightship LV-33		1857		1872	Relief (1857 – 1861); Martins Industry (1862 – 1864); Relief (1864 – 1868); Fishing Rip (1868 – 1869); Tybee Island Knoll (1869 – 1872)	Unknown	^{[B]}
Lightship LV-34		1866		1924	Relief (1866 – 1876); Frying Pan Shoal (1871 – 1875); Martins Industry (1876 – 1880); Rattlesnake Shoal (1880 – 1886); Martins Industry (1887 – 1892); Rattlesnake Shoal (1892 – 1894); Charleston (1894 – 1924)	Unknown	^{[B]}
Lightship LV-35		1858		1862	Martins Industry (1858 – 1862)	it was originally sunk by the Confederate States Navy in the Savannah River in 1862. Four years later it was raised, and intended to be used for lightship duly as LV-35. Subsequently, it was found to be too damaged so it was scrapped.	^{[D]}
Lightship LV-37		1869		1893	Five Fathoms Bank (1869 – 1876); Winter Quarter Shoal (1876 – 1888); Relief (1888); Fenwick Island Shoal (1888 – 1892); Relief (1892 – 1893)	Sank on station on August 4, 1893 with the loss of four crewmen.	^{[E]}
Lightship LV-38		1870		1892	Relief (1870 – 1871); Rattlesnake Shoal (1871 – 1880); Relief (1881 – 1883); Frying Pan Shoal (1883 – 1888); Relief (1888 – 1889); Rattlesnake Shoal (1889 – 1892)	Unknown	^{[E]}
Lightship LV-39		1875		1935	Vineyard Sound (1875 – 1876); Five Fathom Bank (1876 – 1877); Relief (1877 – 1897); Brenton Reef (1897 – 1935)	Sank in 1975 near Beverly, Massachusetts.	
Lightship LV-58		1894		1905	Nantucket New South Shoal (1894 – 1896); Fire Island (1896 – 1897); Relief (1897 – 1905)	Sank in 1905 due to a gale.	
Lightship LV-71		1897		1918	Diamond Shoals (1897 – 1918)	Torpedoed, and sank in 1918	
Lightship LV-73		1901		1944	Pollock Rip Shoal (1901 – 19??); Vineyard Sound (19?? – 1944)	Sunk on September 19, 1944 in a hurricane.	
Lightship LV-79		1904		1967	Five Fathom Bank (1904 – 1924); Relief (1924 – 1926); Barnegat (1927 – 1942); Examination Vessel, WWII (1942 – 1945); Barnegat (1945 – 1967)	Now a museum in Philadelphia, Pennsylvania.	
Lightship LV-82		1912		1936	Buffalo (1912-1913); Relief (1916-1925); Eleven Foot (1926-1936)	Scrapped in 1942, or possibly sunk by vandals in 1945.	
Lightship LV-83		1905		1960	Blunts Reef (1905 – 1930); San Francisco (1930 – 1942); Examination Vessel, WWII (1942 – 1945); San Francisco (1945 – 1951); Relief (1951 – 1960)	Now a museum in Seattle, Washington.	
Lightship LV-87		1907		1966		Now a museum in New York City, New York.	
Lightship LV-97		1895		1918	Bush Bluff (1895 – 1918)	Scrapped in 1945.	
Lightship LV-100		1929		1971	Blunts Reef (1930 – 1942); Examination Vessel, WWII (1942 – 1945); Blunts Reef (1945 – 1959); Relief (1959 – 1969); San Francisco (1969 – 1971)	Transferred to the U.S. Navy on August 6, 1971 for further transfer to Vietnam. it is unknown what became of this ship.	^{[F]}
Lightship LV-101		1916		1963	Cape Charles (1916 – 1924); Relief (1925 – 1926); Overfalls (1926 – 1951); Stonehorse Shoal (1951 – 1963)	Now a museum in Portsmouth, Virginia.	
Lightship LV-102		1916		1963	Southwest Pass (1917 – 1918); South Pass (1918 – 1933); Relief (1933 – 1934); Brenton Reef (1935 – 1962); Cross Rip (1962 – 1963)		
Lightship LV-103		1921		1970	Relief (1921 – 1923); Grays Reef (1924 – 1926); Relief (1927 – 1928); Grays Reef (1929); Relief (1929 – 1933); North Manitou Shoal (1934 – 1935); Relief (1935); Lake Huron (1936 – 1970)	Now a museum in Port Huron, Michigan.	
Lightship LV-105		1922		1944	Diamond Shoal (1922 – 1942); Examination vessel (1942 – 1944)		
Lightship LV-106		1923		1967	Nantucket Shoals (1923 – 1931); Relief (1931 – 1934); Nantucket Shoals (1934 – 1936); Relief (1936 – 1942); Examination vessel (1942 – 1945); Relief (1945 – 1967)		
Lightship LV-107		1923		1968	Cape Lookout Shoals (1924 – 1933); Winter Quarter Shoal (1934 – 1942); Examination vessel (1942 – 1956); Winter Quarter Shoal (1945 – 1960); Delaware (1960 – 1965); Relief (Third District) (1965 – 1968)	Moored at the Liberty Landing Marina in Liberty State Park, Jersey City, New Jersey	
Lightship LV-108		1923		1970	Relief (Third District) (1923); Five Fathom Bank (1924 – 1942); Examination vessel (1942 – 1945); Five Fathom Bank (1945 – 1970)		
Lightship LV-109		1923		1966	Relief (6th district) (1924 – 1954); Savannah (1954 – 1964); New Orleans (165 – 1966)		
Lightship LV-110		1923		1972	Pollack Rip (1924 – 1942); Examination vessel (1942 – 1945); Pollack Rip (1945 – 1947); Vineyard Sound (1945 – 1947); Cross Rip (1954 – 1958); Buzzards Bay (1959 – 1961); Relief (4th and 5th districts) (1961 – 1967); Barnegat (1967 – 1969); Five Fathom Bank (1970 – 1971)		
Lightship LV-111		1926		1969	Northeast End (1927 – 1932); Ambrose Channel (1932 – 1952); Portland (1952 – 1969)		
Lightship LV-112		1936		1975	Nantucket Shoals (1936 – 1942); Examination Vessel, WWII (1942 – 1945); Nantucket Shoals (1945 – 1958); Relief (1958 – 1960); Nantucket Shoals (1960 – 1975)	Now a museum in East Boston, Massachusetts.	
Lightship LV-113		1930		1968	Swiftsure Bank (1930 – 1942); Examination Vessel, WWII (1942 – 1945); Swiftsure Bank (1945 – 1961); Umatilla Reef (1961); Relief (1961 – 1968)	Sank on June 16, 1988 while being towed to Ketchikan, Alaska.	^{[F]}
Lightship LV-114		1930		1971	Fire Island (1930 – 1942); Examination Vessel, WWII (1942 – 1945); Diamond Shoal (1945 – 1947); Relief (1947 – 1958); Pollock Rip (1958 – 1969); Portland (1969 – 1971)	Scrapped in 2007 after sinking (later raised) in New Bedford, Massachusetts.	^{[F]}
Lightship LV-115		1930		1965	Frying Pan Shoals (1930 – 1942); Examination Vessel, WWII (1942 – 1945); Frying Pan Shoals (1945 – 1964); Relief (1964 – 1965)	Operational, and available for rent	^{[F]}
Lightship LV-116		1930		1970	Fenwick Island Shoal (1930 – 1933); Chesapeake (1933 – 1942); Examination Vessel, WWII (1942 – 1945); Chesapeake (1945 – 1965); Delaware (1965 – 1970)	Now a museum in Baltimore, Maryland	^{[F]}
Lightship LV-117		1931		1934	Nantucket Shoals (1931 – 1934)	Sank in 1934 after being struck by the RMS Olympic.	^{[F]}
Lightship LV-118		1938		1972	Cornfield Point (1938 – 1957); Cross Rip (1958 – 1962); Boston (1962 – 1972)	Now a museum in Lewes, Delaware.	
Lightship WLV-604		1951		1979	Columbia River (1951 – 1979)	Now a museum in Astoria, Oregon.	
Lightship WAL-605		1951		1975	Overfalls (1951 – 1960); Blunts Reef' (1960 – 1969); Relief (1969 – 1975)	Now a museum in Oakland, California.	
Lightship WLV-612		1950		1985	San Francisco (1951 – 1969); Blunts Reef (1969 – 1971); Portland (1971 – 1975); Nantucket Shoals (1975 – 1983)	Sold to private owner, operational and available for charter. She is the last lightship to be decommissioned by the coast guard.	
Lightship WLV-613		1952		1983	Ambrose Channel (1952 – 1967); Relief (1967 – 1979); Nantucket Shoals (1979 – 1983)	Sold to private owner. Located in Wareham and New Bedford, Massachusetts in the 2010s.	

== Notes ==
- A. Name assigned retroactively in 1938. During her years in service, this ship was referred to exclusively by her station name.
- B. Name/hull number assigned between 1867–70. Previously, she was referred to exclusively by her station name.
- C. LV-12 was assigned to two ships. From circa 1867 to 1871, LV-12 was the former Guthrie and LV-22 was an unnamed Fifth District relief vessel. In 1871, old LV-12 was decommissioned and LV-22 was renumbered LV-12. For clarity, this list refers to her as LV-22 exclusively.
- D. Name/hull number assigned between 1867–68 in anticipation of her return to service, but she was found not fit, condemned, and sold.
- E. Either LV-37 or LV-38 was the first lightship to have launched with a LV designation. Except for the anomalously numbered LV-10 (which would have been 43), all subsequent US lightships were numbered sequentially.
- F. Six identical vessels: LV 100/WAL 523 (1929), LV 113/WAL 535 (1929) and LV 114 / WAL 536 (1930) built at Albina Iron Works, Portland, Oregon. LV 115 / WAL 537 (1930), LV 116 / WAL 538 (1930) and LV 117 (1930) built at Charleston Drydock & Machine Company, Charleston, South Carolina.
