= Lightship (disambiguation) =

Lightship may refer to:

- Lightvessel, a moored ship that has light beacons mounted as navigational aids
- The Lightship, a 1985 American drama film directed by Jerzy Skolimowski
- The Lightship (novel), by Siegfried Lenz on which the film was based
- Lightcraft, a space- or air-vehicle driven by laser propulsion
- Light displacement, a displacement figure that measures a ship complete in all respects, but without consumables, stores, cargo, crew, and effects
- Lightships, an alias of Gerard Love of Teenage Fanclub
- a spacecraft which uses a solar sail for propulsion
- Lightship RV, an American company that designs and manufactures battery-electric travel trailers
- a type of blimp operated by The Lightship Group, a subsidiary of the American Blimp Corporation

== See also ==
- List of lightships of the United States
- Lightvessels in the United Kingdom
