= USS Magnet (YDG-9) =

Degaussing vessel of the US Navy

History

United States
- Name: USS Magnet
- Builder: Albina Engine and Machine Works, Portland, Oregon
- Laid down: 27 May 1943
- Launched: 30 September 1943
- Commissioned: 10 July 1944
- Decommissioned: 11 December 1946
- Renamed: Magnet, 1 February 1955
- Reclassified: ADG-9, 1 November 1947
- Stricken: 21 February 1975
- Fate: Sunk as target 4 March 1976

General characteristics
- Displacement: 640 long tons (650 t)
- Length: 184 ft 6 in (56.24 m)
- Beam: 34 ft (10 m)
- Draft: 9 ft (2.7 m)
- Propulsion: 2 × General Motors 12-567A diesel engines, 2,900 hp (2,163 kW) each; 2 shafts
- Speed: 14 knots (26 km/h; 16 mph)
- Complement: 51
- Armament: 1 × 3-inch/50-caliber gun; 4 × single 20 mm guns

The third USS Magnet (ADG-9) was a degaussing vessel of the United States Navy, named after the magnet (the third U.S. Naval vessel to bear the name). Originally planned as a patrol craft escort (PCE-879), she was laid down on 27 May 1943 by the Albina Engine & Machine Works of Portland, Oregon; launched 30 September 1943; reclassified YDG-9 on 23 December 1943; and commissioned 10 July 1944.

== Service history ==
Following shakedown and training out of San Pedro, Los Angeles, YDG-9 continued operations on the west coast, first for the 11th Naval District and then as a unit of ServRon 8. Later assigned to SevRon 6 to service, in close proximity, the striking forces as they moved closer to Japan, she established and operated degaussing ranges and provided facilities for inspection, calibration, and adjustment of shipboard degaussing equipment in forward areas, primarily for minesweepers. After World War II ended, she operated with mine groups at Okinawa and, after 29 January 1946 at Sasebo, Japan as those groups cleared the waters to allow safe passage to both military and merchant shipping.

Returning to the United States later in the year, she decommissioned 11 December 1946 at San Diego where she remained berthed, into 1969, as a unit of the Pacific Reserve Fleet. After entering the Reserve Fleet, YDG-9 was reclassified ADG-9 on 1 November 1947, and named Magnet on 1 February 1955, the third U.S. Navy ship of the name.

Struck from the Naval Register on 21 February 1975, Magnet was sunk as a target on 4 March 1976 off the coast of Baja California, Mexico at 31°16′N 117°40′W at a depth of 1,050 fathoms (6,300 feet; 1,920 meters).
