= SS Charles L. Wheeler Jr. =

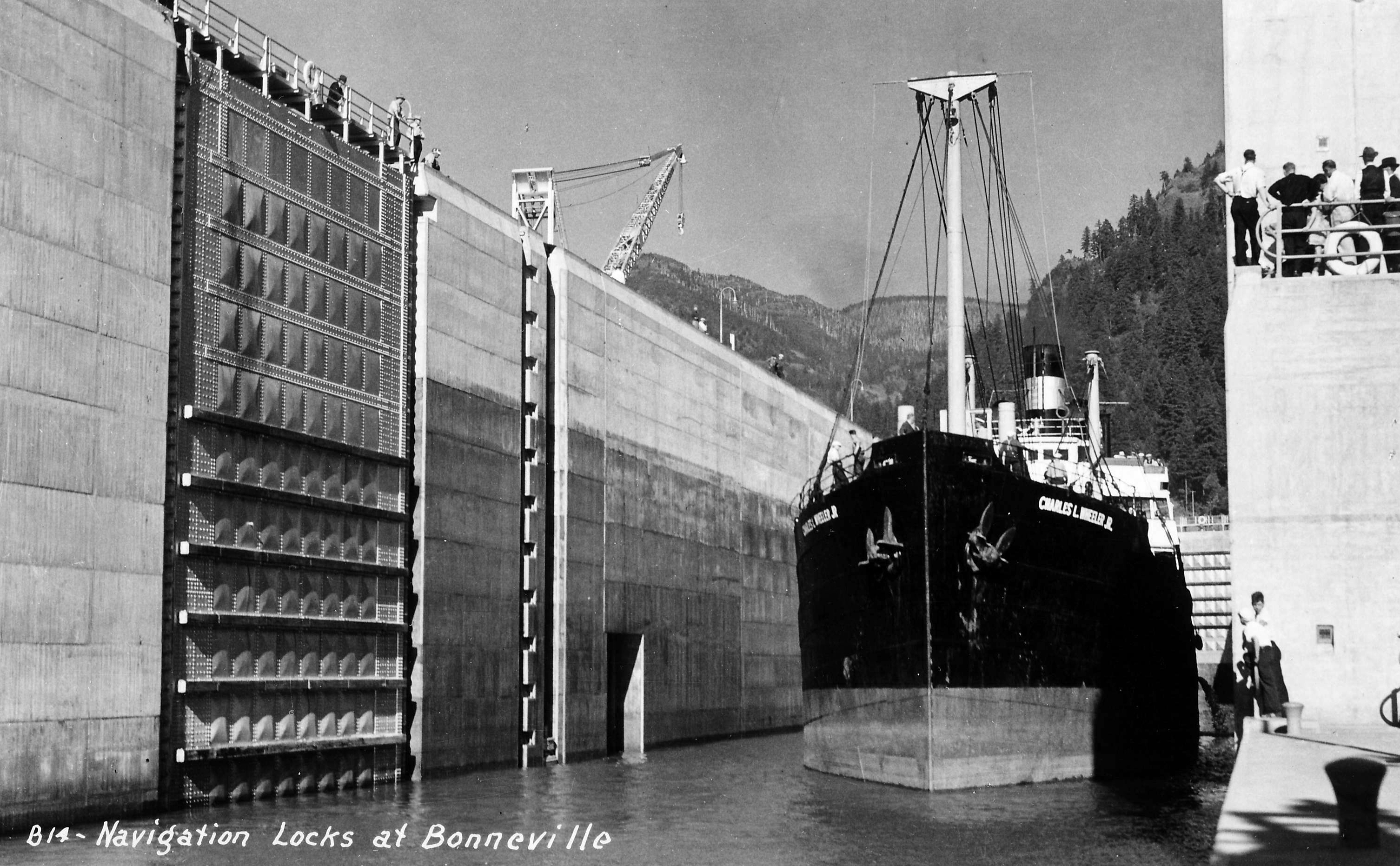
- SS Charles L. Wheeler Jr. in the Bonneville Lock

History
- Name: Charles L. Wheeler Jr.
- Namesake: Charles L. Wheeler Jr.
- Owner: U.S. Shipping Board
- Operator: McCormick Steamship Company
- Builder: Albina Engine & Machine Works, Portland, Oregon
- Launched: 4 May 1918
- Out of service: 1948
- Fate: Scrapped in 1948
- Notes: Only ocean-going freighter to transit the Bonneville Locks, in 1938

General characteristics
- Tonnage: 2,205 GRT

SS Charles L. Wheeler Jr. was a 2,205-ton cargo ship, ordered by the United States Shipping Board as the Point Judith and delivered in July 1918 by the Albina Engine and Machine Works of Portland, Oregon. Renamed Charles L. Wheeler Jr. in 1929, the ship was scrapped in 1948.

== Career ==
On 17 December 1933, Charles L. Wheeler Jr. ran aground on Sand Island in Oregon's Columbia River. She was refloated on 30 December 1933.

In 1938, the world's largest single-lift lock was opened at the Bonneville Dam on the Columbia River. As part of the opening ceremonies of the lock, Captain Arthur Riggs, a veteran upper Columbia river pilot, took Charles L. Wheeler Jr. – which was operated by McCormick Steamship Company and loaded with sugar, building materials, beer, hardware, automobiles, and general freight – upstream from Portland, transited the Bonneville Locks and continued on to the historic upper river steamboat port of The Dalles, Oregon. She was the first ship to transit the lock at Bonneville Dam and the first ocean-going merchant ship to transit the Columbia River all the way to The Dalles, located 200 miles (320 km) upstream from the Pacific Ocean. Once unloaded at the Port of the Dalles, the ship was then loaded with lumber, wheat, flour, and other local products for the return voyage. Residents of The Dalles had hoped the trip would bring increased business to their port, but the trip was a one-time event, and the Columbia River is dominated by barge traffic.
