= Albina Engine & Machine Works =

Defunct shipyard in Portland, Oregon, U.S.

Coordinates: 45.5388°N 122.6783°W

- Type: Private
- Industry: Shipbuilding; Ship repair
- Founded: 1904
- Founder: William Cornfoot
- Defunct: 1969
- Fate: Acquired by the Dillingham Corporation
- Successor: Dillingham Ship Repair
- Headquarters: Portland, Oregon, U.S.

Albina Engine & Machine Works was a shipyard along the Willamette River in Portland, Oregon, United States. It was located in the Albina area of Portland along N. River Street and N. Loring Street.

== History ==
Albina Engine & Machine Works was founded in 1904 by William Cornfoot and others. In 1920, the company formed a subsidiary, the Albina Marine Iron Works, which also built ships and made ship repairs. Albina Marine was eventually merged into the parent company.

The Albina Engine & Machine Works produced a number of freighters during World War I, but operated mainly as a repair yard during the 1920s and 1930s. The Albina yard expanded its workforce and production during Portland's World War II shipbuilding boom. It specialized in producing subchasers, vessels designed to combat German U-boats. Albina Engine & Machine Works also built Landing Craft Support vessels, cargo ships, and barges.

Business declined in the post-war years, and the company was acquired by the Dillingham Corporation in 1969, along with its subsidiary Fabri-Valve. It continued operating as Albina Engine & Machine Works for several years before changing its name to Dillingham Marine & Manufacturing Co. in 1975; its ship repair division was rebranded as Dillingham Ship Repair. United Press International reported in 1986 that the Dillingham Corporation was seeking a buyout. The assets of Dillingham Ship Repair were sold to Cascade General in 1987.

== Ships constructed ==
=== World War I ===
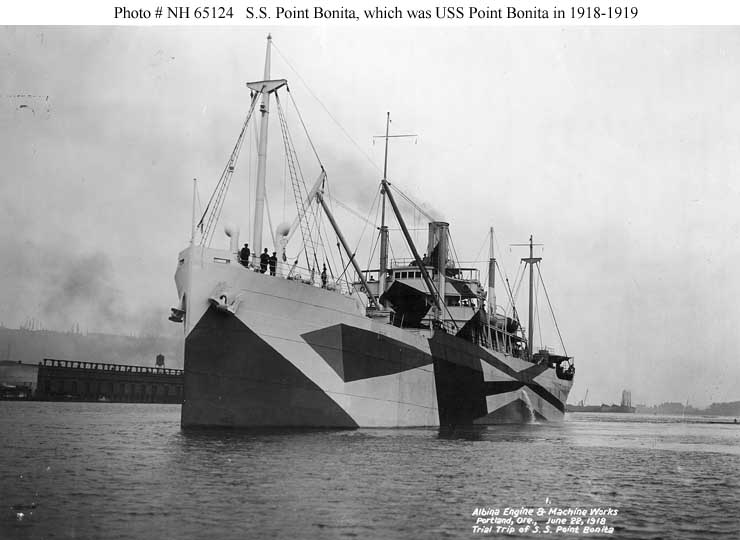
S.S. Point Bonita (American freighter, 1918) on a trial trip on 22 June 1918, near the yard of her builder, the Albina Engine & Machine Works, Portland, Oregon. This ship was in commission as USS Point Bonita (ID-3496) from October 1918 to April 1919

For World War I in 1918 and 1919, Albina built 17 cargo ships. These were their first ships, Hulls #1 to 17. These were requisitioned by the United States Shipping Board (USSB). Some of the cargo ships built for World War I:

- Point Loma/Margit Hull #1, renamed SS Dorothy Phillips
- Point Arena/Erling Hull #2
- Point Bonita Hull #3 wrecked in 1953
- Point Lobos/Skjold Hull #4 burnt in 1967
- Point Judith became Charles L. Wheeler Jr. Hull #5
- Point Adams/Gorm Hull #6 foundered in 1953
- Cadaretta Hull #7
- Caddopeak Hull #8 renamed USS Besboro
- Callabasas Hull #9 torpedoed and lost in 1942 as Watsonville
- Jacox Hull #10 wrecked in 1943
- Glendola Hull #11 torpedoed and lost in 1940
- Glendoyle Hull #12 foundered in 1948
- Glorieta Hull #13 torpedoed and lost in 1942
- Glymont Hull #14 sunk by gunfire in 1942
- Glyndon Hull #15 Foundered in 1924
- Meriden Hull #16 scuttled in 1946, renamed USS Majaba
- Doylestown Hull #17 foundered in 1968

=== Light vessel ===
In 1929–1930, the Albina Marine Iron Works built three lightvessels for the U.S. Coast Guard. Each was: length of 133 feet 3 inches (40.6 m), 33 feet (10.1 m) beam and draft of 11 feet 9 inches (3.6 m) These were specially built as a self-propelled ship that would remain on station for nine months of a year. Outfitted with housekeeping and the light .

- LV 100 Blunts Reef Completed on 10 February 1930, transferred to the US Navy in 1971, taken to Vietnam.
- LV 113 Swiftsure Banks Completed on 15 June 1930, donated in 1969 to Sea Scouts, back, then back to USCG, sold for scrap. Sank at shipyard in Willamette River, Portland Or., raised and used for floating restaurant from 1983 to 1987. Sold in 1988 and sank in while being towed to Alaska.
- Lightship No. 114 Fire Island (WAL-536) Completed 1930. Lightship No. 114 was an active lightship from 1930 to 1971. Her last port was at Portland, Maine. In 1975 she was purchased by the city of New Bedford, Massachusetts. She was not drydocked for normal maintain, her hull rusted. She sank at her station on May 31, 2006, and scrapped.

=== Submarine chaser ===
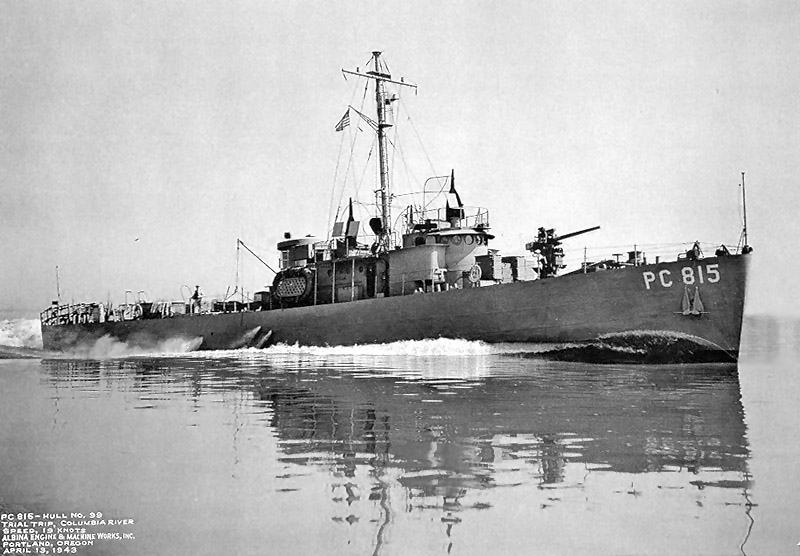
USS PC-815, a subchaser built at Albina Engine & Machine Works in 1942

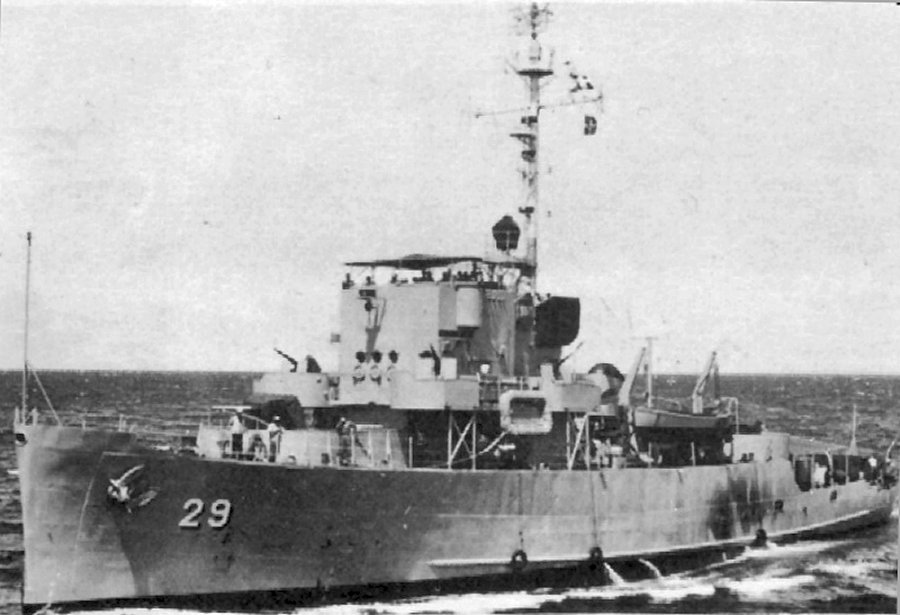
RPS Negros Occidental (PS-29)

21 of 343 PC-461-class submarine chasers built during World War II for the US Navy:

- PC-569 delivered 8 May 42
- PC-570 18 April 42
- PC-570 18 April 42
- PC-571 22 May 42
- PC-572 17 June 42
- PC-578 13 July 42
- PC-579 24 August 42
- PC-580 26 September 42
- PC-581 9 October 42
- PC-582 22 October 42
- PC-1077 9 December 42
- PC-1078 5 February 43
- PC-1079 7 March 43
- PC-1080 29 March 43
- PC-1081 16 April 43
- PC-1082 8 May 43
- USS PC-815 8 January 43 collision and sank off San Diego 11 September 1945
- PC-816 9 June 43
- USS PC-817 13 July 43
- PC-818 3 August 43
- PC-819 2 August 43
- PC-820 30 September 43

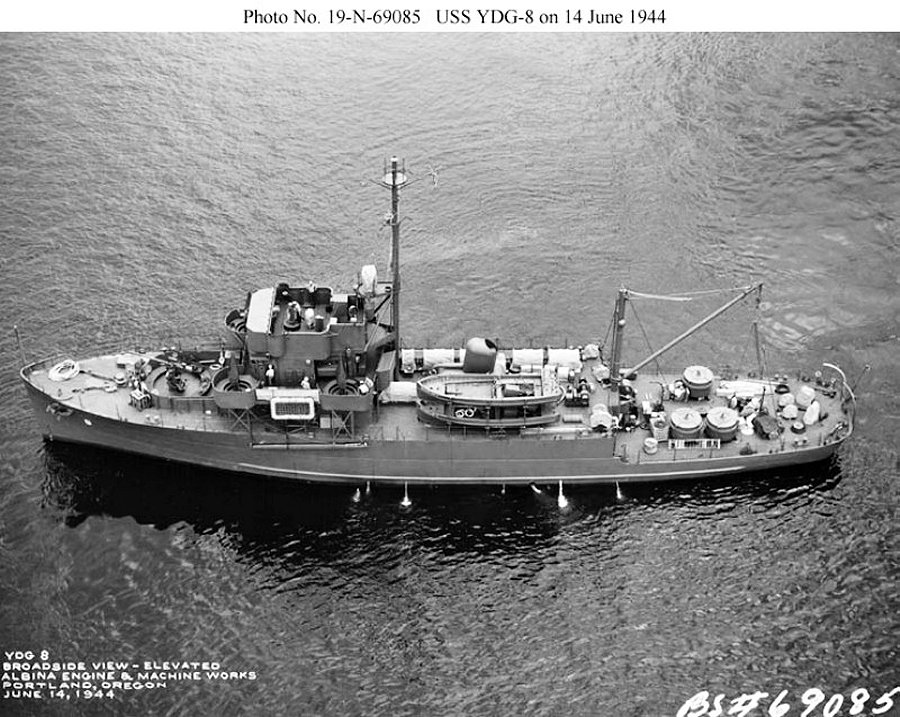
USS Lodestone

=== PCE-842-class patrol craft ===
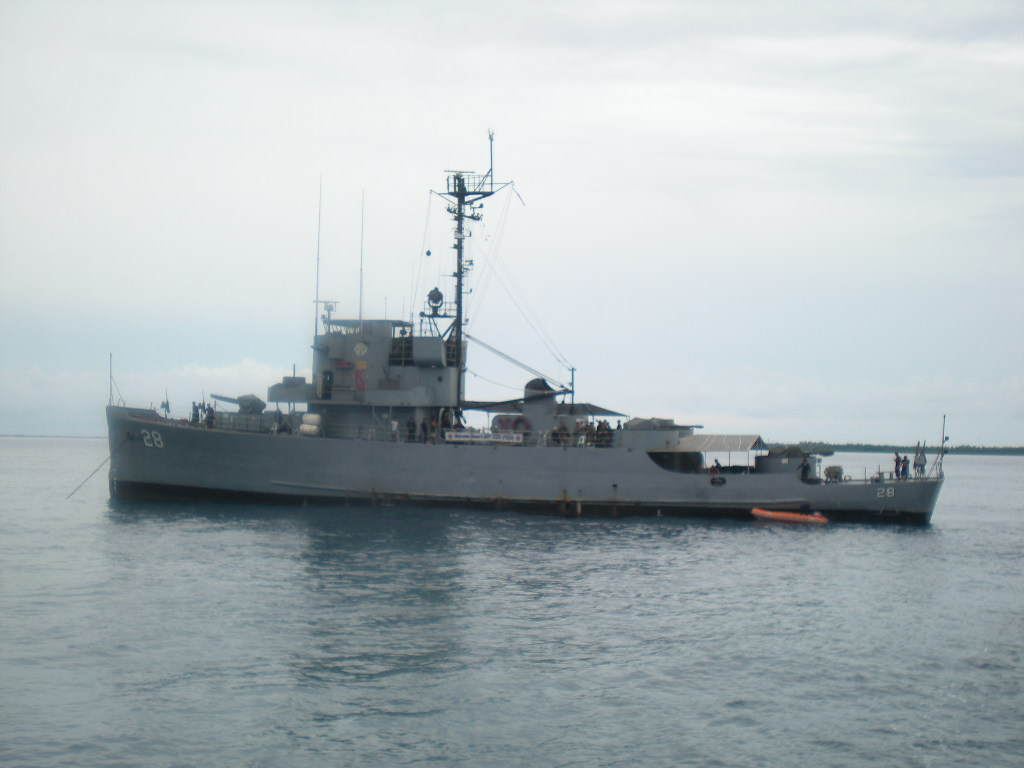
BRP Cebu (PS-28)

20 of 68 PCE-842-class patrol craft submarine chaser built for World War II US Navy, 184 feet long with 794 DWT:

- PCE-867 delivered 20 June 43
- PCE-868 31 August 43
- PCE-869 19 September 43
- PCE-870 5 October 43
- PCE-871 29 October 43
- PCE-872 29 November 43 became BRP Cebu
- PCE-873 15 December 43
- PCE-874 31 December 43
- PCE-875 19 January 44
- PCE-876 10 June 44, became USS Lodestone
- PCE-877 14 February 44 became USS Havre
- PCE-878 13 March 44
- PCE-879 10 July 44
- PCE-880 29 April 44
- PCE-881 31 July 44
- PCE-882 23 February 45
- PCE-883 13 November 44
- PCE-884 30 March 45
- PCE-885 30 April 45
- PCE-886 31 May 45

=== Landing Craft ===
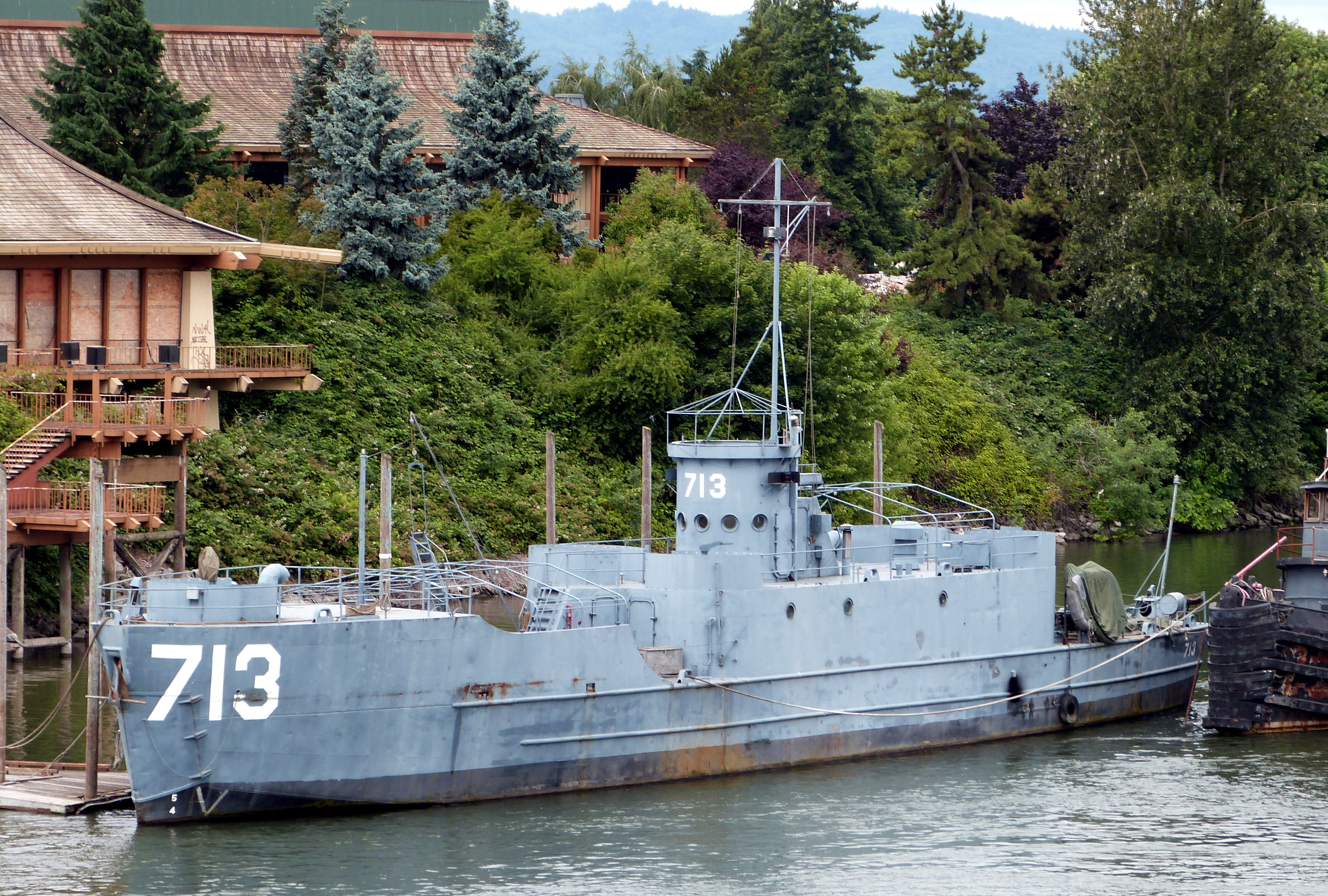
Partially restored USS LCI(L)-713 in Portland, Oregon, in 2012

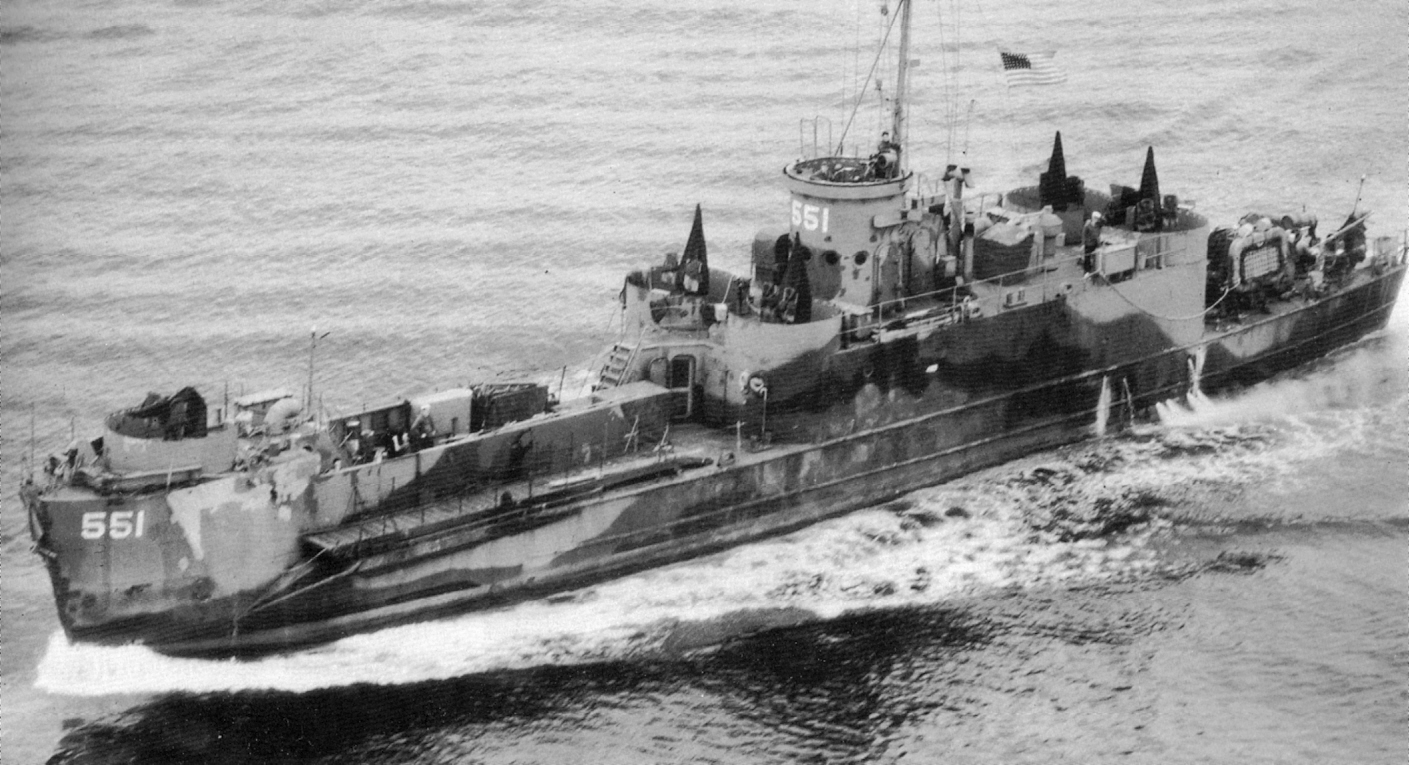
The U.S. Navy large infantry landing craft USS LCI(L)-551 in May 1945

- LCI (L) Landing Craft were not given names. Albina built LCI(L) 1013 to LCI(L) 1033 in 1944. There were Landing Craft Infantry Large. LCI(L) had a displacement 216 tons light, 234 tons landing; and 389 tons loaded. LCI(L) had a length of 158' 5 1/2", beam of 23' 3", light draft of 3'1". To speed of 16 kts and 4 kts continuous. They had four to five Oerlikon 20 mm cannons, each gun was mounted inside of a round gun tub with a shield. LCI(L)-1022 became the USS Rail (AMCU-37).
- LCC (1) Albina built 27, LCC 25470 to LCC 25496 in 1943 and 1944. Landing Craft, Control Mark 1: displacement full, 30 tons, length56 feet - 17.1 m, beam 4 m, draft 1.2 m, top speed 13.5 kts, 450 HP, 2 diesel engines, armament two 90 mm gun. Landing Craft, Control were used by Scouts and Raiders leading the Invasion of Normandy on 6 June 1944. They had new radar system and help guide the landing craft on each landing.
- LCC(2) Albina built 15, LCC(2) 39044 to LCC(2) 39058, in 1944. Landing Craft, Control, Mark 2, 56 feet long, 30 tons LDT.
- LCS(L) Albina built The Landing Craft Support (Large), or "LCS(L) Mark 3. Built from LCS(L) 61 to LCS(L) 78 and LCS(L) 48 to LCS(L) 60. Built on a standard LCI hull and was add more gunfire support and crew accommodation. They had a single 3"/50 caliber gun and/or two twin 40 mm cannon and numerous 20 mm cannon. Many were used in Pacific Theater invasions in late 1944 and into 1945.

=== Concrete Barge ===
These were a type of concrete ship a class of Type B ships. Steel shortages led the US military to order the construction of small fleets of ocean-going concrete barge and ships. Displacement: 245 long tons (249 t), full load: 1360 tons. Length:165 ft 4 in (50.39 m), beam: 42 ft (13 m), draft: 8 ft (2.4 m), crew of 3 men. YOGN were a class Non-self-propelled Gasoline Barge:

- YOGN-114
- YOGN-115 used to support cooling efforts at the Fukushima Daiichi nuclear power
- YOGN-116
- YOGN-117
- YOGN-118
- YOGN-119 renamed YON 367, sunk as target 1973
- YOGN-120 renamed Ex-BG 1165, sunk as target 1978
- YOGN-121
- YOGN-122 Ex-BG 8452, scrapped 1986
- YOGN-123 Ex-BG 6380, YON 252
- YOGN-124 Ex-BG 6383, struck 2006
- YOGN-125 Ex-YWN 154, now YON
- Built by Manitowoc SB in Manitowoc WI, 174 feet long, 440 tons
- YOGN-196 renamed Ex-YO 196, sunk as target 2000
- YO 174
- YO 175
- YO 176
- YO 177
- YOG 61
- YOG 62
- YOG 63
- YOG 64
- YOG 65

=== C1-MT-BU1 ===
The C1-MT-BU1 was a subtype of a Cargo Type C1 ship, modified from the C1 design for use as lumber transports, 5,032 DWT, launched in late 1945 and early 1946.

- 4 of 4 C1-MT-BU1
  - Oregon Fir wrecked and scrapped in 1967
  - California Redwood
  - Washington Cedar
  - Arizona Pine

=== Coastal freighter – FS ===
Albina built 20 Coastal freighters, type FS in 1944 and 1945. Most were transferred to the Dutch Government. There they were used in Dutch East Indies, now Indonesia for inter-island shipping. The Dutch Government sold them to Koninklijke Paketvaart-Maatschappij in 1948. These were 555 DWT and 176 feet long.
