= Nantucket Shoals =

Area of dangerously shallow water in the Atlantic Ocean

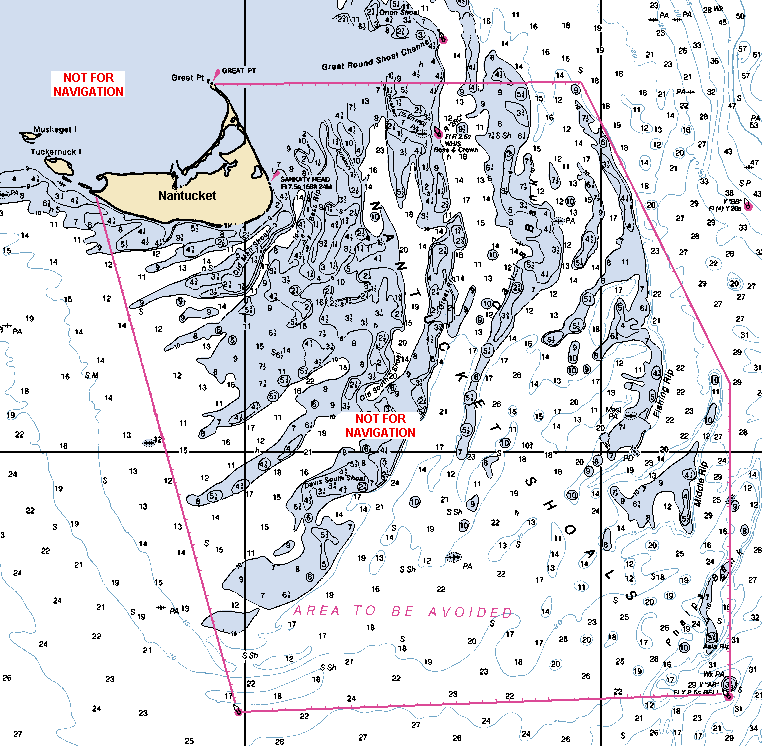
Detail from NOAA nautical chart 12300 showing the Nantucket Shoals in relation to Nantucket Island.

Nantucket Shoals is an area of dangerously shallow water in the Atlantic Ocean that extends from Nantucket Island, Massachusetts, eastward for 23 miles (37 km) and southeastward for 40 miles (64 km); in places water depth can be as shallow as 3 feet (0.91 m). Depth soundings are unpredictable due to the constant change caused by strong currents, which are rotary rather than reversing. The shoals lie just off of a major transatlantic shipping lane. Mariners have regarded them as among the most hazardous waters off the U.S. coast since at least the 1840s. Numerous ships have been wrecked here, most recently and notably the oil tanker Argo Merchant in December 1976. Until 1983, the edge of the shoals was guarded by the Nantucket Lightship.

== Geography and navigation ==
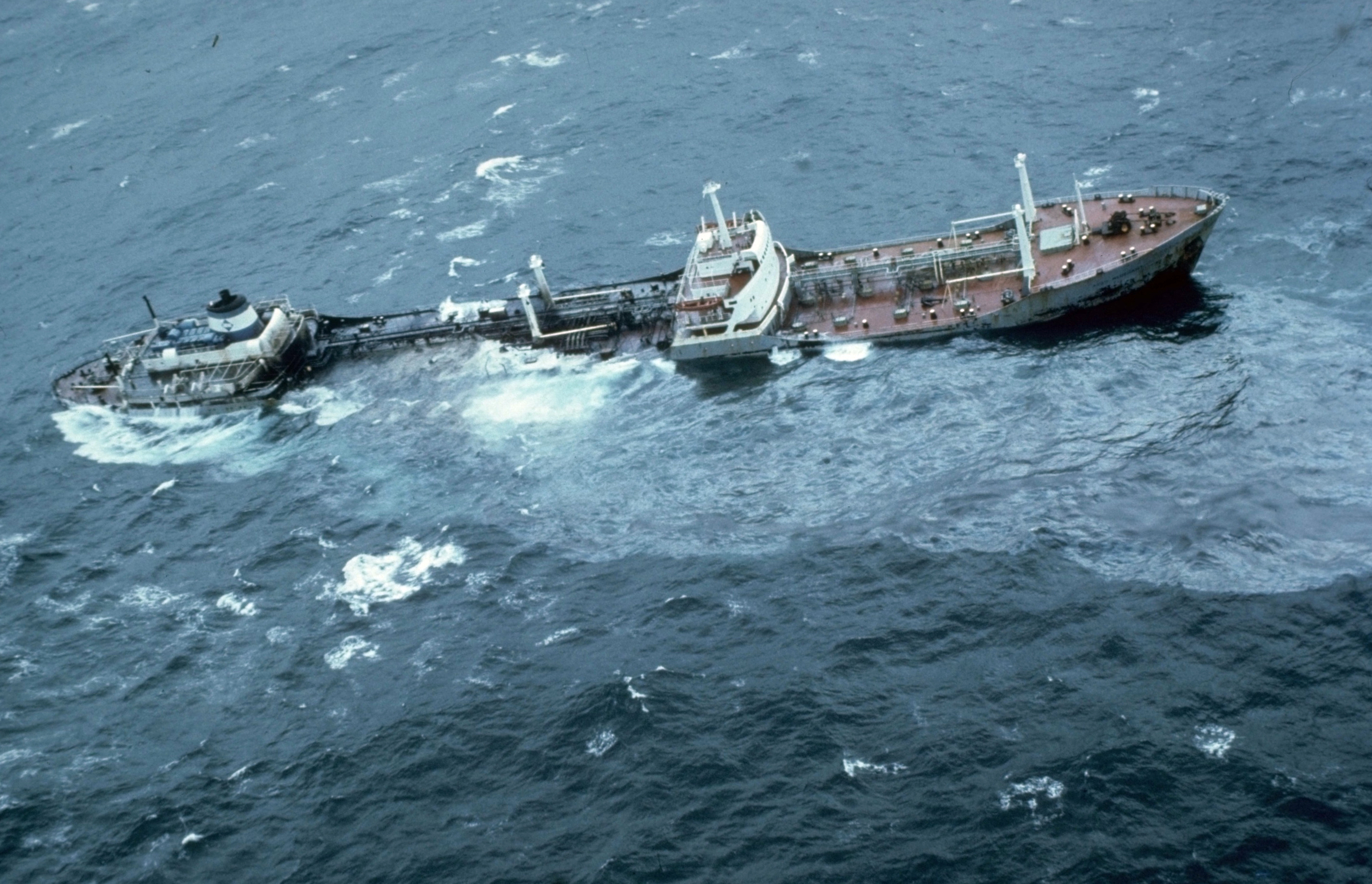
The oil tanker Argo Merchant aground on Middle Rip, December 15, 1976.

Nantucket Shoals is made up of the following features:

- Asia Rip
- Davis Bank
- Fishing Rip
- Middle Rip
- Phelps Bank

According to the 2010 edition of the United States Coast Pilot, the International Maritime Organization has established an "area to be avoided" for the Nantucket Shoals. Vessels transporting oil or hazardous materials and vessels of more than 1,000 gross tons should avoid the area bounded by the points in the below table.

| Point | Coordinates (links to map & photo sources) | Notes |
|---|---|---|
| Madaket | 41.275°N 70.208333°W | |
| Southwest point | 40.72°N 70.008333°W | |
| Near Asia Rip | 40.741667°N 69.316667°W | |
| Near Fishing Rip | 41.075°N 69.316667°W | |
| Northeast point | 41.391667°N 69.525°W | |
| Great Point Light | 41.39°N 70.046667°W | |

== History and reputation ==
The shoals have had a reputation for danger since at least the first half of the 19th century. An 1843 report to Congress said the Shoals of Nantucket were "known and dreaded by every navigator on the Atlantic seaboard", and that many ships listed as missing by insurers had almost certainly been lost on them. Between 1846 and 1848, a U.S. Coast Survey hydrographic party under Lieutenant Charles Henry Davis located several previously uncharted dangers off the island, among them Davis's South Shoal.

The current United States Coast Pilot still describes the shoals as making the area "one of the most dangerous parts of the coast of the United States". It warns of erratic currents of 3 to 5 knots (5.6 to 9.3 km/h) around their edges, which the shoals can deflect so sharply that the flow runs in opposite directions on either side of a single shoal, and notes that calm, clear days are rare there, because calm seas tend to bring fog and clear weather tends to bring rough water. It advises deep-draft vessels, and lighter vessels without local knowledge, to avoid the shoals entirely when possible, and gives the danger of stranding and the protection of the environment as the reasons for the International Maritime Organization's area to be avoided. Staff at Nantucket's Egan Maritime Institute count more than 800 recorded shipwrecks in the waters around the island, which has been nicknamed the "graveyard of the Atlantic"; the institute's executive director attributes that reputation chiefly to the shoals and to the region's nor'easters.

A lightship marked the edge of the shoals from 1854 until 1983, when Nantucket Shoals became the last lightship station in the United States to be discontinued. The National Park Service regards it as both the most important U.S. lightship station for transatlantic shipping and the best known; its light was the last American beacon seen by outbound ships and the first sighted by inbound ones. Duty on the station was hazardous. The first lightship was blown off its station in December 1855 and went aground on Long Island. In 1891 the writer Gustav Kobbé, who wrote about his visit aboard the lightship in The Century Magazine, judged it the loneliest and most perilous post in the entire U.S. lighthouse service. In December 1905, lightship No. 58, leaking and overwhelmed by a storm while filling in on the station, became the first American vessel to call for help by wireless before it sank.

The station's lightship LV-117 carried a radio beacon that transatlantic ships used as a homing signal. In January 1934 it was sideswiped by the United States Lines liner Washington, and on May 15, 1934, the White Star Line's RMS Olympic, sister ship of the Titanic, rammed and sank it in thick fog, killing seven of its eleven crew. Using reparations paid by the White Star Line, the United States Lighthouse Service built a replacement, LV-112, the largest lightship ever built in the United States, with heavy reinforcement and extensive watertight compartmentalization meant to keep it afloat after a collision. LV-112 served on the station for 39 years and survived 110 mph (180 km/h) winds and 70-foot (21 m) seas during Hurricane Edna in 1954. It was designated a National Historic Landmark in 1989.

In December 1976 the Liberian tanker Argo Merchant ran aground on the shoals and broke apart, spilling its entire cargo of about 7.7 million US gallons (29,000 m^{3}) of heavy fuel oil. It was one of the largest oil spills in U.S. history up to that time and the most intensively studied, and it was the National Oceanic and Atmospheric Administration's first major coordinated oil-spill response.
