= USS Rail (AMCU-37) =

Minesweeper of the United States Navy

History

United States
- Name: USS Rail
- Builder: Albina Engine & Machine Works, Portland, Oregon
- Laid down: 3 March 1944
- Launched: 17 April 1944
- Commissioned: 18 May 1944, as USS LCI(L)-1022
- Decommissioned: 14 August 1946
- Recommissioned: 13 September 1952, as USS Rail (AMCU-37)
- Decommissioned: 13 October 1957
- Reclassified: LSIL-1022, 28 February 1949; AMCU-37, 7 March 1952; MHC-37, 7 February 1955
- Stricken: 1 January 1960
- Identification: IMO number: 5000639
- Honors and awards: 2 battle stars (World War II)
- Fate: Sold

General characteristics
- Class & type: Landing Craft Infantry Large
- Displacement: 387 long tons (393 t)
- Length: 159 ft (48 m)
- Beam: 23 ft 8 in (7.21 m)
- Draft: 5 ft 8 in (1.73 m)
- Propulsion: 8 × GM diesel engines (4 per shaft), 1,600 bhp (1,193 kW); 2 × variable pitch propellers
- Speed: 14 knots (26 km/h; 16 mph)
- Complement: 40
- Armament: 5 × single 20 mm AA guns

USS Rail (LCI(L)-1022/AMCU-37/MHC-37) was a Landing Craft Infantry Large.of the United States Navy, later converted to an AMCU-7-class coastal minesweeper.

The ship was laid down by the Albina Engine & Machine Works, Portland, Oregon, on 3 March 1944, launched on 17 April 1944, and commissioned as USS LCI(L)-1022 on 18 May 1944.

== World War II Pacific operations ==
After shakedown out of San Diego, California, she steamed for Pearl Harbor on 15 July 1944. After proceeding to Milne Bay, she continued on to the Philippines, took part as a large infantry landing craft in the Ormoc Bay landing on 7 December and the Mindoro landing on 15 December. She then remained in the Philippines until the end of the war, departing Tacloban on 5 September for Okinawa.

== Return Stateside ==
She put into Shanghai before steaming for Pearl Harbor; San Pedro, California; the Canal Zone; and New Orleans, where she arrived on 20 May 1946 and reported to Commander, 8th Naval District, for inactivation.

== Decommissioning ==
She was decommissioned on 14 August 1946, and arrived at Mayport, Florida, on 20 October for lay-up at Green Cove Springs. She was redesignated LSIL-1022 on 28 February 1949. In February 1952 she was moved to Charleston and then New York. On 7 March 1952 she was reclassified a coastal minesweeper (underwater locator), redesignated AMCU-37 and renamed Rail. She was converted by the Brooklyn Naval Shipyard and was recommissioned as USS Rail (AMCU-37) on 13 September 1952.

== Reactivation ==
After shakedown off Norfolk, Rail was assigned to Little Creek, Virginia, to evaluate new underwater mine-locating sonar equipment. In March 1953 she was ordered to U.S. Naval Mine Countermeasures Station in Panama City, Florida, for further sonar evaluation, returning to Little Creek in December.

In June 1954 Rail was ordered to Coco Solo, Canal Zone, and placed under operational control of the Commandant, 15th Naval District. On 7 February 1955, she was reclassified as a coastal minehunter (MHC-37). She operated out of Coco Solo and Guantanamo Bay, putting into Norfolk briefly on 11 June 1956. She returned to Coco Solo, where she remained until sailing north to Boston on 4 September 1957.

== Final decommissioning ==
She decommissioned at New London, Connecticut, on 13 October 1957, and was struck from the Navy List on 1 January 1960.

== Awards ==
Rail earned two battle stars for World War II service.
