= United States lightship Swiftsure (LV-113) =

History

United States Lighthouse Service
- Name: USLHS LV-113 Swiftsure
- Builder: Albina Marine Iron Works, Portland, Oregon
- Cost: $228,121
- Launched: 1 July 1929
- Fate: transferred to the United States Coast Guard, 1 July 1939

United States Coast Guard
- Name: USCGC WAL-535
- Acquired: 1 July 1939 (from U.S. Lighthouse Service)
- Decommissioned: 1 October 1968
- Reclassified: USS YP-397 during World War II
- Homeport: Juneau, Territory of Alaska
- Identification: Call Sign: NMJA (1940-1968)
- Fate: Sunk while being towed, 16 June 1988

General characteristics
- Type: Lightship
- Tonnage: 630 GRT
- Length: 133.25 ft (40.61 m) o/a
- Beam: 30 ft (9.1 m)
- Draught: 13.25 ft (4.04 m)
- Installed power: 350 bhp (260 kW)
- Propulsion: one electric motor driven by four 75 kw diesel engines
- Speed: 10 knots (19 km/h; 12 mph)
- Complement: 48 (World War II)

United States lightship No. 113, known as Swiftsure, was a steel-hulled lightship in commission with the United States Lighthouse Service as LV-113 from 1929 to 1939, and in the fleet of the United States Coast Guard as WAL-535 from 1939 until 1968. During World War II, she was given the designation USS YP-397.

== History ==
She was laid down at the Albina Marine Iron Works, a subsidiary of the Albina Engine and Machine Works, in Portland, Oregon, and launched on 1 July 1929. She had two masts each capped with a 375mm electric lens lantern (15,000 cp) and a 4-way air diaphone fog horn. During World War II, she was reassigned to the Alaskan Sea Frontier to serve as an examination vessel. Designated as a Yard Patrol Craft YP-397, she was painted grey and armaments added: a 4"/50 caliber gun forward, two .50 caliber machine guns on either side of the bridge, one .30 caliber machine gun aft, and a Y gun with 17 depth charges. She was assigned to the Icy Strait at the northern entrance to the Inside Passage between Cape Spencer on the Alaskan mainland to the north and Indian Head Light, on Chichagof Island to the south. She remained on station continuously sending a launch for provisions at nearby ports. In addition to confirming the identity of all ships trying to enter the Inside Passage, she assisted in assembling convoys that were en route to further points in Alaska and the Aleutian Islands. After the war, she returned to her post at Swiftsure Bank.

On 1 October 1968, she was decommissioned and donated to the Sea Scouts. In 1982, she sunk at Willamette Harbor but was later raised and repaired to serve as a floating restaurant in Newport, Oregon. She was sold in 1988 and while being towed to Ketchikan, Alaska sunk in 590 feet of water on 16 June 1988.

=== Assignments ===
- 1930–1942 Swiftsure Bank (Washington)
- 1942–1945 Examination vessel
- 1945–1961 Swiftsure Bank
- 1961 Umatilla Reef (Washington)
- 1961–1968 Relief (Washington)
