= USS Buttress =

Auxiliary minelayer in the United States Navy during World War II

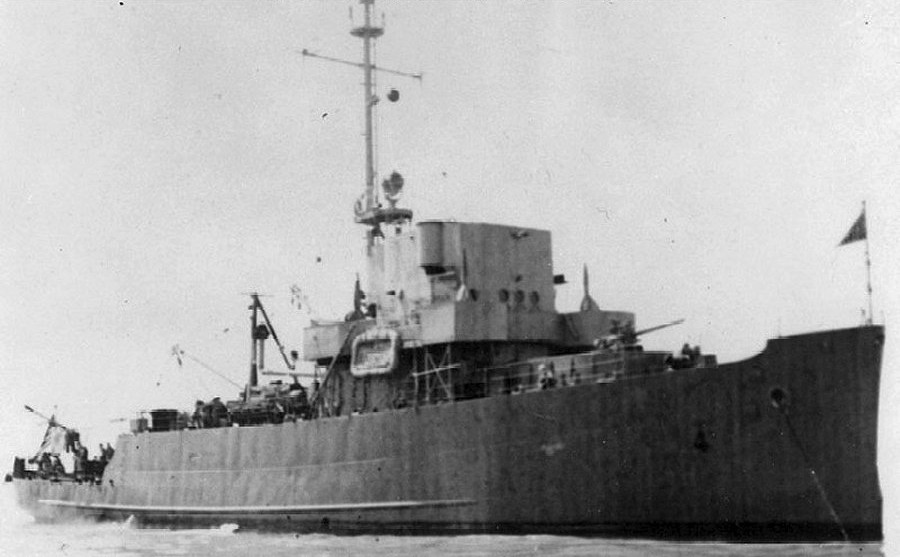

History

United States
- Name: Buttress
- Builder: Albina Engine & Machine Works
- Laid down: 11 May 1943
- Launched: 26 August 1943
- Commissioned: 13 March 1944
- Decommissioned: 24 February 1947
- Reclassified: ACM-4, 15 June 1944
- Stricken: 5 March 1947
- Identification: IMO number: 6507464
- Fate: Sold, 30 October 1947

General characteristics
- Class & type: PCE-842-class patrol craft
- Displacement: 903 long tons (917 t)
- Length: 184 ft 6 in (56.24 m)
- Beam: 33 ft 1 in (10.08 m)
- Draft: 9 ft 5 in (2.87 m)
- Speed: 15.4 knots (28.5 km/h; 17.7 mph)
- Complement: 99
- Armament: 1 × 3 in (76 mm) gun; 6 × 40 mm guns

USS Buttress (PCE-878/ACM-4) was an auxiliary minelayer (ACM) in the United States Navy during World War II. This ship and USS Monadnock (ACM-10) were the only ACMs not previously U.S. Army mineplanters.

== Construction ==
Buttress was laid down as Patrol Craft Escort USS PCE-878 on 11 May 1943 at Portland, Oregon, by the Albina Engine & Machine Works; launched on 26 August 1943; and commissioned on 13 March 1944.

== Service history ==
=== World War II Pacific Theatre operations ===
Following commissioning, she entered the Mare Island Navy Yard for conversion to a drill mine laying and recovery ship. On 15 June 1944, PCE-878 was renamed Buttress and redesignated ACM-4. The ship was assigned to Service Squadron (ServRon) 6 and saw duty at advanced bases in the central and western Pacific Ocean through the end of the war. She returned to the West Coast at San Francisco late in December 1946.

=== Decommissioning ===
Buttress was moved north to Bremerton, Washington, where she was decommissioned on 24 February 1947. Her name was struck from the Navy list on 5 March 1947, and she was sold to J. W. Rumsey on 30 October 1947 as Pacific Reefer. Her name was later changed to Aleutian Fjord and then to Mr. J. She was scuttled sometime in the 1990s.
