= United States lightship LV-117 =

Lightvessel, sunk 1934

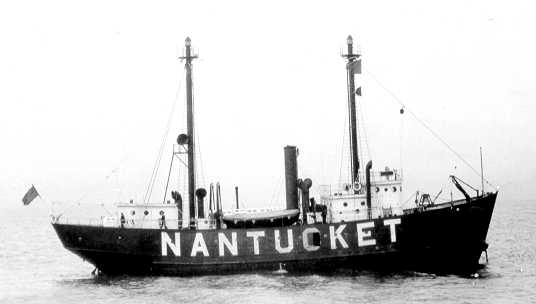
- LV 117 Nantucket, on station, February 26, 1931

History

United States
- Name: Nantucket Lightship LV117
- Operator: United States Lighthouse Service
- Builder: Charleston Dry Dock & Machine Co.
- Cost: $274,434; ($5,289,141 in modern dollars)
- Laid down: 1 May 1929
- Launched: 14 March 1930
- Acquired: 13 September 1930
- Fate: Sunk in collision with RMS Olympic, 15 May 1934

General characteristics
- Type: Lightvessel
- Displacement: 630 tons
- Length: 135 ft 3 in (41.22 m)
- Beam: 30 ft 0 in (9.14 m)
- Draft: 13 ft 0 in (3.96 m)
- Propulsion: Diesel-electric – One 350 HP electric motor driven by any or all of four 75 KW diesel engine/generator units
- Speed: @ 300 RPM; max speed 10 kn (19 km/h; 12 mph), average 9 kn (17 km/h; 10 mph).
- Complement: 11
- Armament: Warning devices included: a 375 mm (14.8 in) electric lens lantern at each masthead, Electric diaphragm horn (bi-directional) mounted on the mainmast and hand-rung fog warning bell. Equipped with submarine oscillator when built.

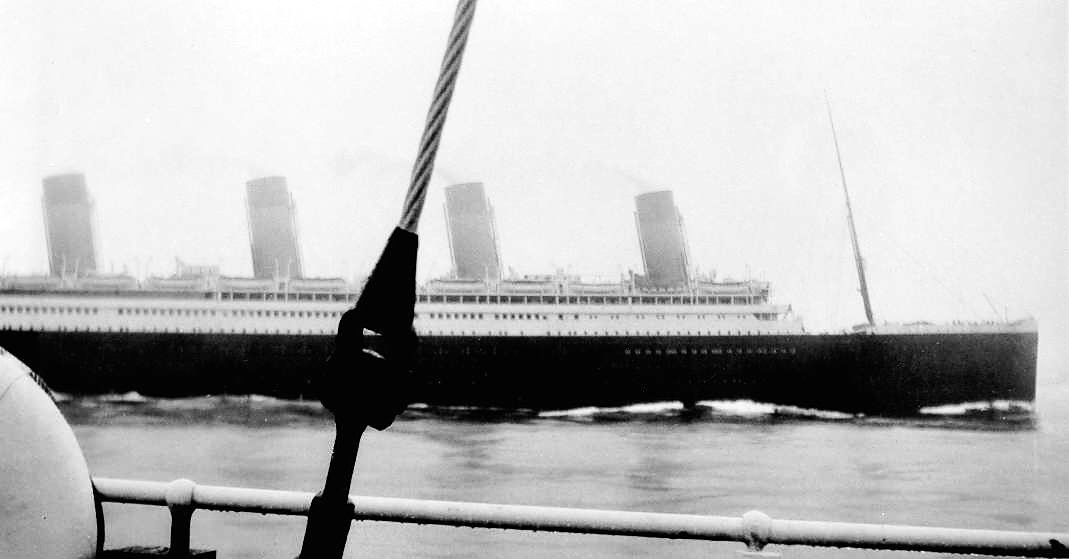
RMS Olympic passes Nantucket Lightship 117 close aboard in early January 1934. She sank the lightship four months later.

LV-117 was a lightvessel of the United States Lighthouse Service. Launched in 1931, she operated as the Nantucket lightship south of Nantucket Shoals. Moored south of Nantucket Island, Massachusetts, the lightship was at the western part of the transatlantic shipping lane and the first lightship encountered by westbound liners approaching New York Harbor. On May 15, 1934, one of these liners, RMS Olympic, rammed and sank LV-117, killing seven of her crew.

== Description ==
LV-117 was a steel-hulled vessel with steel deckhouses fore and aft, a funnel amidships for engine exhaust, and two masts. An electric lantern topped each mast, and an electric foghorn was on the mainmast. The vessel also had submarine signal capability, using a submarine oscillator, giving greater range and reliability for fog signals. Four 101 horsepower (75 kW) diesel engines drove generators, providing power for both the signalling apparatus and a 350 horsepower (260 kW) electric propulsion motor. Her sister vessels were San Francisco LV-100, Swiftsure LV-113, New Bedford LV-114, Frying Pan LV-115, and Chesapeake LV-116.

She was stationed south of the Nantucket Shoals in a location 42 miles (68 km) south by east from Sankaty Head Lighthouse on Nantucket Island. The vessel was described at the time as "the newest thing in lightships, a great advance over the sailing vessels that stood watch ... for over seventy years." She was moored in 30 fathoms (180 ft; 55 m) by 2 in (5.1 cm) diameter steel chain cables attached to a pair of 7,000 pounds (3,200 kg) anchors.

== Service ==
On February 8, 1931, LV-117 took aboard the eight-man crew of the fishing schooner Aloma, which sank 5 mi (8.0 km) from the lightship. The men were taken ashore by the Coast Guard on February 9.

During a storm on June 27, 1933, the lightship broke her mooring chain and drifted away from her position. She was unable to regain it for several days. Not until the gales subsided on June 30, was her crew able to return LV-117 to her station.

On January 6, 1934, four months before LV-117 was sunk by the Olympic, the lightship had a less serious glancing collision by another liner, SS Washington, at the time the largest ocean liner yet built in the United States. The radio antenna yards were carried away and minor damage occurred to some hull plates. The near-sinking caused great concern to the lightship's crew; in April 1934, radio operator John Parry told friends, "Some day we are just going to get it head on, and that will be the finish. One of those big liners will just ride through us."

== Sinking ==
During the night of May 14, 1934, Olympic, sister-ship to the lost Britannic and Titanic, was homing in on the lightship's radio beacon. Nearly 75 times larger than the 630-ton lightship, the White Star liner was steaming at about 20 knots (37 km/h; 23 mph) in the center of the western terminus of the trans-Atlantic shipping lanes. By 5.00 am on the morning of May 15, Olympic was in thick fog that necessitated the reduction of its speed from 16 knots to 12 knots (22 km/h; 14 mph).

The lightship's radio signal and fog signals were picked up by Olympic at about 10.55 am and appeared to be off the ship's starboard bow. Captain John Binks ordered Olympic's course to be changed ten degrees to port and her speed to be reduced to ten knots. Her radio operator attempted unsuccessfully to make contact with LV-117 to determine her exact position, but the fog signals could still be heard, apparently at a longer distance off the starboard bow. It appeared that Olympic was well clear of the lightship, but a few minutes later the lookout spotted LV-117 dead ahead. Binks ordered the ship's rudder to be set full to port, the engines to be set full speed astern, and the watertight doors to be closed throughout the vessel. Olympic slowed to only about 3 knots (5.6 km/h; 3.5 mph) but it was too late and she collided with the side of the lightship at 11.06 am at 40°37′2″N 69°37′6″W. Although she was not moving fast, her sheer weight (52,000 tons when fully fuelled), and thus her kinetic energy, completely wrecked the smaller vessel.

Olympic's passengers barely noticed the collision, which First Class passenger Sir Arthur Steel-Maitland registered only as a "slight jar". The changed settings of the engines were much more noticeable, sending vibrations throughout the ship as they were put into reverse and brought up to maximum revolutions. Passengers came onto the deck to find out what was going on and were met by the smell of oil and the sight of debris in the sea around Olympic.

For those aboard LV-117, the collision was felt much more directly. "We saw the Olympic loom out of the fog a short distance away," stated C.E. Mosher, LV-117's first mate, in a newspaper interview two months after the accident. "The visibility was only 500 ft (150 m). A crash was inevitable. I sounded the collision alarm. We all donned life preservers. Then we waited." When the collision came, said Mosher, "it was more like a hard push and a terrific shaking, a crunching and grinding. It was not a loud smash as one might expect. The Olympic kept coming through ..." John Perry told the press, "At the time of the smash I was in the radio cabin. I barely had time to get on deck and swim for my life." Robert Laurent commented that as "it all happened so quickly, you had no chance to panic. We all had our life preservers and it was a good thing that we did."

Olympic responded extremely rapidly to the accident. The portside emergency lifeboat had already been swung outboard and was lowered just before Olympic came to a halt. The starboard emergency boat was launched a few minutes later, along with one of Olympic's motor boats. The scene was described by The New York Times:

Nosing through the dense pall of the fog, the boats searched the area for almost two hours, while those on board the liner prayed for their success. A hatch drifted past, bearing the figure of an unconscious man. Shouts from the liner directed one of the lifeboats to the rescue. The same boat picked up a swimmer not far away, and the floating body of a man who appeared to be dead went past.

The lifeboats disappeared from sight in the murk and the watchers from the liner waited breathlessly. A red buoy bearing the name 'Nantucket' floated by, informing most of the passengers for the first time what they had struck.

After three-quarters-of-an-hour the starboard lifeboat came into view. As those who eagerly lined the rails saw that it contained only one figure aside from those at the oars, and that [figure was] motionless, they groaned.

But a minute later the port boat appeared with five or six men in the blue 'monkey suits' of the Lighthouse Service. Two of those also appeared to be lifeless. One man in civilian clothes, Captain Braithwaite, sat stiff and upright ... a cut on his head bled profusely ..."

The three boats managed to rescue seven of the lightship's eleven crewmen and brought them aboard, but three of the seven died in Olympic's hospital. Captain Braithwaite, (Note: George Braithwaite, the first mate, was acting master in command at the time of the sinking, as Captain David B. Studley was ashore.) First Mate C.E. Mosher, Radio Operator John Perry and Oiler Laurent Robert all survived the disaster. Engineer William Perry, Oiler Justin Richmond, Cook Alfred Montero, First Cook I. Pinna, Seaman E.B. George, Seaman John Fortes and Seaman John Rodriques did not survive the sinking. The lightship had sunk so quickly that anyone below decks had little chance of surviving.

Binks ordered Olympic to resume course for New York at 12.29 pm once it had become clear that there were no more survivors. The liner had suffered only minimal damage in the collision, comprising some dented hull plates which were repaired in a dry dock in Southampton in May–June 1934. She was allowed to leave New York at the scheduled time on May 17 after a brief inspection. The dependents of those killed in the accident were given restitution through the United States Employees's Compensation Act.

== Later history ==
LV-117 was replaced by the LV-112. The Cunard–White Star Line paid for the construction of LV-112 as reparation for the accident.

The lightship now rests about 200 ft (61 m) deep, lying on her port side in an area with unpredictable currents up to 3 kn (5.6 km/h; 3.5 mph). The wreck of the vessel is remarkably intact; LV-117's aft mast lies alongside the hull of the ship, while the forward mast has been broken off, lying perpendicular to the wreck. It was discovered in the 1970s by Captain Paul Forsberg of the Viking Fleet fishing concern, though it was not clear at the time that the wreck was that of LV-117. Its identification was not confirmed until as late as July 1998 when an expedition led by diver Eric Takakjian made the first of what would be many visits to the wreck site. It is reported to be a difficult and dangerous dive, as the wreck is entangled in many fishing nets. Nonetheless, Takakjian describes it as "fascinating" and "a really exciting and rewarding experience" to visit. He was surprised to find how well-preserved it was, as it had been rumored at the time that the lightship had been cut in half by Olympic.
