= Lightship No. 114 =

- Lightship 114 docked c. 1990

History

United States Coast Guard
- Builder: Albina Engine & Machine Works, Portland, Oregon
- Cost: $228,121
- Laid down: 1 September 1928
- Launched: 14 June 1930
- Acquired: 19 July 1930
- Out of service: 1971
- Fate: Scrapped May 2007

General characteristics
- Displacement: 630 Tons
- Length: 133 ft 3 in (40.61 m)
- Beam: 33 ft (10 m)
- Draft: 13 ft 3 in (4.04 m)
- Installed power: 4 Diesel-electric 75 KW
- Propulsion: 350 hp (260 kW) electric motor; 5 ft 10 in (1.78 m) propeller
- Speed: 9.3 knots (10.7 mph; 17.2 km/h) (avg) 10.3 knots (11.9 mph; 19.1 km/h) (max) on coast to coast transit
- Notes: Light: 375mm electric lens lantern at each masthead, 16,000cp; Fog signal: Air diaphone using 4-way multiple horns; hand operated bell
- Lightship No. 114
- U.S. National Register of Historic Places
- Location within Massachusetts
- Location: New Bedford, Massachusetts
- Coordinates: 41°38′8″N 70°55′16″W
- Built: 1930
- Architect: US Lighthouse Establishment; Albina Iron Works
- NRHP reference No.: 90000777
- Added to NRHP: 30 May 1990

Lightship No. 114, later U.S. Coast Guard WAL 536, that served as lightship Fire Island (NY), Examination Vessel (WW II), Diamond Shoal (NC), 1st District relief vessel, Pollock Rip (MA) and Portland (ME). After decommissioning in 1971, in 1975 the lightship became a historic ship at the State Pier in New Bedford, Massachusetts. She received little maintenance, and eventually sank at her moorings in 2006 and was sold for scrap the next year.

== Construction ==
Built at Albina Engine & Machine Works in Portland, Oregon, Lightship No. 114 was one of six identical vessels with three built at Albina Iron Works and three by Charleston Dry Dock & Machine Company of Charleston, South Carolina. Four were eventually required on the Atlantic stations so that No. 114, the last constructed at Portland, was required to make the transit from Oregon to New York.

The design for all six vessels (Note: LV 100/WAL 523 (1929), LV 113/WAL 535 (1929) and LV 114 / WAL 536 (1930) at Albina Iron Works. LV 115 / WAL 537 (1930), LV 116 / WAL 538 (1930) and LV 117 (1930) at Charleston Drydock & Machine Company.) was for a length overall of 133 feet 3 inches (40.6 m), 108 feet (32.9 m) waterline length with a 33 feet (10.1 m) beam and draft of 11 feet 9 inches (3.6 m) forward and 13 feet 3 inches (4.0 m) aft. A special machinery arrangement was selected to fit the requirement for a self-propelled vessel that would remain on station for nine months of a year requiring power for housekeeping, equipment and the light. The design was for four Winton Engine Corporation four cylinder diesel engines each direct connected to 75 kilowatt, 125 volt General Electric generators that could be coupled to develop 350 horsepower on the propulsion motor at 300 revolutions and, when on station, could singly handle the entire ship's electrical load even under adverse conditions. Two 7.5-kilowatt Cummings diesel generating sets were provided for auxiliary and in-port power and an oil-fired boiler provided heating.

== Service history ==
Lightship No. 114 left Portland on 15 July 1930 for Astoria, Oregon from which she departed 5 August under Captain Jacob Nielsen for her first station at Fire Island, New York with stops at San Francisco, San Pedro, Balboa, Panama, Navassa, Charleston, and Portsmouth to arrive at New York 20 September—the first lightship to make the transit from west to east. The distance of 6,368 nautical miles (7,328 mi; 11,794 km) was accomplished in 31 days, 12 hours, 49 minutes with actual running time of 756.5 hours for an average speed of 9.3 knots (10.7 mph; 17.2 km/h) and maximum speed of 10.3 knots (11.9 mph; 19.1 km/h).

The ship served as the Fire Island lightship until 1942. From 1942 to 1945 she was armed for wartime service with a single 6-pounder gun and placed into 3d District service as an examination vessel at Bay Shore, New York. Her log reports how real the threat to shipping on the east coast was as the log for Christmas Day 1941 mentions flares from a German U-boat being spotted.

Following the war, LV 114 was reassigned to Diamond Shoals off Cape Hatteras. She served there for two years before becoming a Relief lightship. For the next eleven years she served on relief duty until assigned to Pollock Rip station in 1958. When the Pollock Rip station was discontinued, LV 114 was moved north to Portland, Maine where she served for the final two years of her career. She was put out of service in 1971.

The Coast Guard originally planned to use LV 114 as a museum but those plans fell through. Instead, she was awarded to the city of New Bedford, Massachusetts in 1975. In 1976 the lightship received a cosmetic overhaul and played a starring role in the city's bicentennial celebrations. In 1990 LV 114 was placed on the National Register of Historic Places, but little was done to preserve or promote her after the Bicentennial, and in 2006 she sank at her pier.

Shortly after her sinking, LV 114 was refloated and the city of New Bedford tried to auction the ship off. The starting bid was $25,000, but no one bid on the ship. Even after the city reduced the starting bid to $10,000 no one stepped forward to bid. After the failed attempts to sell the lightship, the city had historical artifacts removed from her, then placed the ship on eBay. After four days, the ship sold for $1,775 to Sea Roy Enterprises. The city however decided not to dispose of LV 114 for such a small amount. Eventually, Sea Roy Enterprises agreed in May, 2007 to pay the city $10,000 for the lightship. The following month she was broken up and her remains sold to salvage yards.

== Station assignments ==
The lightship served at:

- 1930-1942: Fire Island (NY)
- 1942-1945: Examination Vessel, WWII
- 1945-1947: Diamond Shoal (NC)
- 1947-1958: Relief (1st District)
- 1958-1969: Pollock Rip (MA)
- 1969-1971: Portland (ME)

== See also ==
- National Register of Historic Places listings in New Bedford, Massachusetts

== Bibliography ==
- "Progress of Construction: Charleston Dry Dock and Machine Co". Pacific Marine Review. 27 (August). San Francisco: J.S. Hines: 364. 1930.
- "New Lightship Makes Remarkable Run". Pacific Marine Review. 27 (December). San Francisco: J.S. Hines: 537–538. 1930.
- "Vessel Designation: LV 114/WAL 536". U.S. Coast Guard Lightships & Those of the U.S. Lighthouse Service. United States Coast Guard.
