= United States lightship Nantucket (LV-112) =

Lightvessel

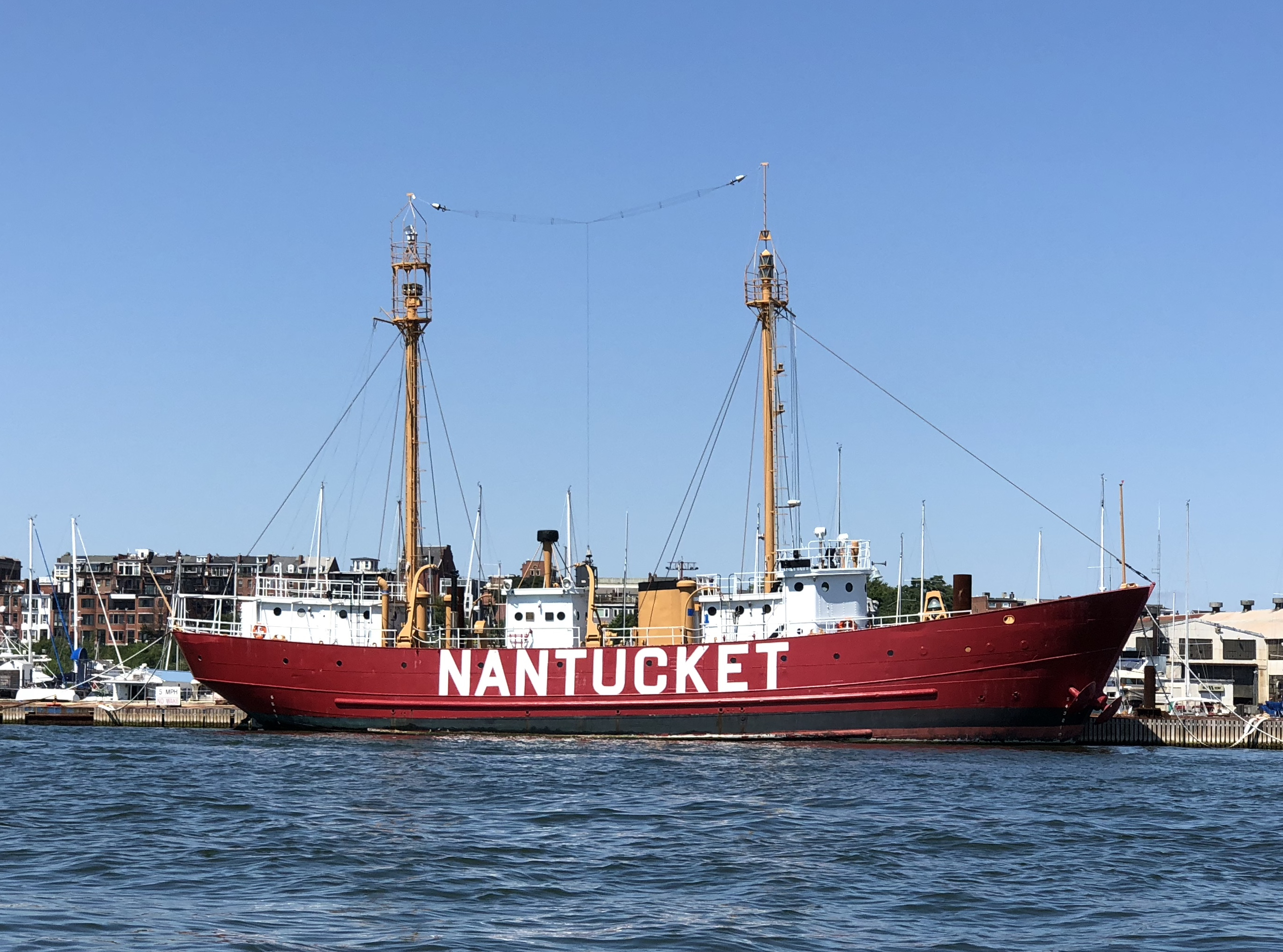
- Nantucket docked in Boston Harbor in 2018.

History

United States
- Operator: United States Lighthouse Service (1936–1939); United States Coast Guard (1939–1983); Nantucket Lightship Preservation Inc. (1986–)
- Builder: Pusey and Jones
- Cost: $300,956
- Yard number: 431
- Laid down: 17 July 1935
- Launched: 21 March 1936
- Completed: 9 May 1936 (delivery)
- In service: 1936
- Out of service: 1983
- Honors and awards: Declared National Historic Landmark in 1989
- Status: Museum ship

General characteristics
- Type: Lightvessel
- Displacement: 1,050 tons
- Length: 148 ft 10 in (45.36 m) LOA; 121 ft 6 in (37.0 m) LBP
- Beam: 32 ft (9.8 m)
- Draft: 16 ft 3 in (4.95 m)
- Propulsion: 2 boilers, 1 600 i.h.p. reciprocating engine (1936-1960); 900 h.p. diesel (1960-)
- Speed: 12 knots (22 km/h; 14 mph)
- Armament: 1 3-inch (76 mm) gun (1942–1945)
- Lightship No. 112, Nantucket
- U.S. National Register of Historic Places
- U.S. National Historic Landmark
- Location within Massachusetts
- Location: East Boston, Massachusetts
- Coordinates: 42°21′40″N 71°02′07″W
- Built: 1936
- Architect: Pusey and Jones
- NRHP reference No.: 89002464

Significant dates
- Added to NRHP: 20 December 1989
- Designated NHL: 20 December 1989

United States lightship Nantucket (LV-112) is a National Historic Landmark lightship that served at the Lightship Nantucket position. She was the last serving lightship and at time of its application as a landmark, one of only two capable of moving under their own power. She served as the lightship for such notable vessels as the liners United States, Queen Mary, and Normandie.

The ship was officially designated Light Vessel No. 112 or LV-112 to permanently identify the vessel as the practice was to paint the name of the marked hazard or station on the vessels that often occupied multiple stations.

LV-112 was built to replace LV-117 which had been sunk in a collision while assigned to Nantucket Shoals with special safety features and was the largest light vessel ever built. The vessel was somewhat unusual in being only at the Nantucket station except for the war years of 1942-1945 and 1958-1960 when assigned as the relief vessel for the 1st District during which several stations were occupied relieving other vessels.

== Government service ==
=== Background ===
Light Vessel 117, serving at the Lightship Nantucket position from 1931, was rammed and sunk on 15 May 1934 by Olympic, a sister ship to Titanic, with loss of seven of the eleven crew aboard. The $300,956 cost of the replacement vessel, to be designated LV-112, was paid for by the British Government in compensation for the collision and sinking of LV-117 and was greater than that of any predecessor. LV-112 was built to be indestructible, and outlasted all others, serving until 1983.

=== Construction ===
The light vessel's keel was laid for the U.S. Department of Commerce, Bureau of Lighthouses by the Pusey and Jones Corporation, Wilmington, Delaware, under the firm's contract 1063 as yard hull 431 on 17 July 1935. The vessel was launched on 21 March and delivered on 9 May 1936.

The ship was steel hull and superstructure designed for safety in emergencies. The hull was designed with a high degree of compartmentalization with longitudinal and transverse bulkheads with six exits to the upper deck. Length overall was 148 ft 10 in (45.4 m), 121 ft 6 in (37.0 m) length between perpendiculars, beam of 32 ft (9.8 m) and draft of 16 ft 3 in (5.0 m) with the vessel displacing 1,050 tons. Two oil fired Babcock & Wilcox water tube boilers provided steam for the compound reciprocating engine of 600 i.h.p. to give a maximum speed of 12 kn (14 mph; 22 km/h). In 1960 the steam engine was replaced with a 900 h.p. Cooper-Bessemer diesel.

As built the vessel had a light signal composed of a 500 mm (19.7 in) electric lantern on each of the two mastheads. Fog sound signals were a two tone air diaphone synchronized with a radio beacon, a submarine acoustic oscillator (removed in 1939) and a hand operated bell. For station keeping the ship had a radio direction finder. In 1943 radar was added. In 1960 the lights were replaced with a 500 mm (19.7 in) duplex lens on the foremast and light composed of a four sided revolving lamp with six locomotive headlights on each face on the main mast.

=== Operations ===
The vessel was stationed on Nantucket Shoals from 1936 to 1942. During the war the vessel was withdrawn from the station, armed with a 3" gun, and served as an examination vessel operating out of Portland, Maine until reassigned to the station in 1945. In 1958 LV-112 was replaced on the station by the Relief vessel WLV-196 while LV-112 became the 1st District Relief vessel. LV-112 served at Boston, Pollock Rip Shoal, Stonehorse, Cross Rip, Buzzards Bay and Brenton Reef during that period. In April 1960 the vessel underwent major modification during a refit and modernization at the Coast Guard's Curtis Bay Yard. LV-112 was again assigned to Nantucket Shoals from 1960 until 1975.

== Retirement ==
On 21 March 1975 LV-112 was withdrawn from Nantucket station and replaced by WLV-612 and decommissioned on 28 March 1975 for lay up at Chelsea, Massachusetts. During 6–7 December a volunteer crew of Nantucket Islanders delivered the ship to Nantucket for use as a museum ship until 1984. The vessel was sold in 1986 to Nantucket Lightship Preservation, Inc., of Boston for restoration and preservation.

== Private ownership ==
The vessel was declared a National Historic Landmark in 1989. At that time, the ship was located at the Southern Maine Vocational Technical Institute Pier in South Portland, Maine, but touring along the New England Coast. An organization was seeking a permanent home for her in Portland, Maine.

She later was planned to be located permanently in Staten Island, New York, but sojourned for several years at Oyster Bay, New York. Some controversy has arisen over damage to wharves and unsightliness at Oyster Bay; other locals have wanted her retained there.

She was purchased in October 2009 by the United States Lightship Museum (USLM) under the leadership of Robert Mannino Jr. for $1 and arrived under tow in Boston Harbor on 11 May 2010. She will be restored in two phases over the next several years, a job that will cost $1 million. She is currently undergoing renovations as a floating museum, but is open to the public at Boston Harbor Shipyard and Marina at 256 Marginal Street in East Boston, Massachusetts.

== See also ==
- List of lightships of the United States
- List of National Historic Landmarks in Boston
- National Register of Historic Places listings in northern Boston, Massachusetts
