= Pollock Rip Shoal =

Coordinates: 41.533°N 69.989°W

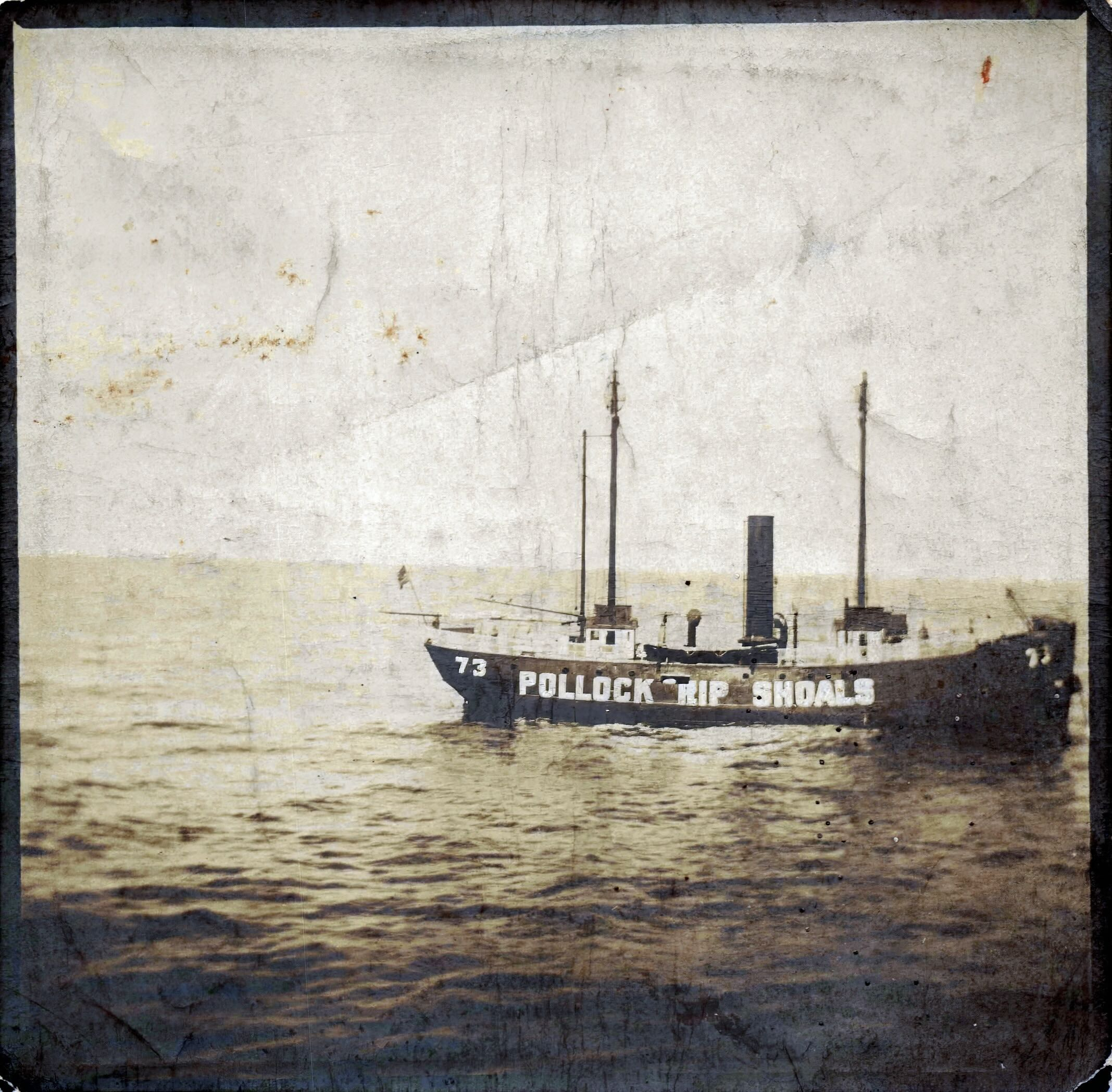
Pollock Rip Shoals Lightship August 15, 1909

The channel at Pollock Rip Shoals is centered about three miles (4.8 km) east of the southerly end of Monomoy Island in Chatham, Massachusetts. The channel, which runs east–west, is about eight miles (13 km) south of the Chatham Lighthouse. Vessels passing around the Cape Cod coastline use the channel as a passage from the Atlantic Ocean to Nantucket Sound. The Pollock Rip Lightship marked the eastern approach to the channel from 1849 to 1969; it has since been replaced by a lighted buoy. The Stonehorse Lightship had previously identified the southeasterly end of the channel until October 1963, when it was removed by the U.S. Coast Guard and replaced with a small buoy.

The channel extends six miles (9.7 km) through the shoals and is 30 feet (9.1 m) deep and 2,000 feet (610 m) wide. It was completed in 1925.
