= List of Allied ships at the Japanese surrender =

These ships of the Allied navies of World War II were present in Tokyo Bay on Victory over Japan Day (2 September 1945) when the Japanese Instrument of Surrender was signed on board the battleship USS Missouri (BB-63). The only two US vessels present at both the Pearl Harbor attack and Tokyo Bay surrender were the USS West Virginia and the USS Detroit.

== Battleships ==
- USS New Mexico (BB-40)
- USS Mississippi (BB-41)
- USS Idaho (BB-42)
- USS Colorado (BB-45)
- USS West Virginia (BB-48)
- USS Iowa (BB-61) (sister ship of USS Missouri and lead ship of the class)
- USS Missouri (BB-63) (The ship on which the surrender was signed)
- USS South Dakota (BB-57)
- HMS Duke of York (17)
- HMS King George V (41)

== Light aircraft carriers ==
- USS Bataan (CVL-29)
- USS Cowpens (CVL-25)
- USS San Jacinto (CVL-30)

== Escort carriers ==
- HMS Ruler (D72)
- USS Salamaua (CVE-96)
- HMS Speaker (D90)

== Heavy cruisers ==
- USS Boston (CA-69)
- USS Chicago (CA-136)
- USS Quincy (CA-71)
- USS Saint Paul (CA-73)
- HMAS Shropshire (73)

== Light cruisers ==
- USS Detroit (CL-8)
- HMNZS Gambia (48)
- HMAS Hobart (I63)
- HMS Newfoundland (C59)
- USS Oakland (CL-95)
- USS Pasadena (CL-65)
- USS San Diego (CL-53)
- USS San Juan (CL-54)
- USS Springfield (CL-66)
- USS Wilkes-Barre (CL-103)

== Destroyers ==
- USS Ault (DD-698)
- HMS Barfleur (D80)
- USS Benham (DD-796)
- USS Blue (DD-744)
- USS Buchanan (DD-484)
- USS Caperton (DD-650)
- USS Charles F. Hughes (DD-428)
- USS Clarence K. Bronson (DD-668)
- USS Cogswell (DD-651)
- USS Colahan (DD-658)
- USS Cotten (DD-669)
- USS Cushing (DD-797)
- USS De Haven (DD-727)
- USS Dortch (DD-670)
- USS Frank Knox (DD-742)
- USS Gatling (DD-671)
- USS Halsey Powell (DD-686)
- USS Healy (DD-672)
- USS Hilary P. Jones (DD-427)
- USS Ingersoll (DD-652)
- USS Kalk (DD-611)
- USS Knapp (DD-653)
- USS Lansdowne (DD-486)
- USS Lardner (DD-487)
- USS Madison (DD-425)
- USS Mayo (DD-422)
- HMAS Napier (G97)
- HMAS Nizam (G38)
- USS Nicholas (DD-449)
- USS Perkins (DD-877)
- HMS Quality (G62)
- USS Robert K. Huntington (DD-781)
- USS Southerland (DD-743)
- USS Stockham (DD-683)
- HMS Tartar (F43)
- USS Taylor (DD-468)
- HMS Teazer (R23)
- HMS Tenacious (R45)
- HMS Terpsichore (R33)
- USS Twining (DD-540)
- USS Uhlmann (DD-687)
- USS Wadleigh (DD-689)
- HMS Wager (R98)
- USS Waldron (DD-699)
- USS Wallace L. Lind (DD-703)
- HMAS Warramunga (I44)
- USS Wedderburn (DD-684)
- HMS Whelp (R37)
- HMS Wizard (R72)
- USS Wren (DD-568)
- USS Yarnall (DD-541)

== Escort Destroyers ==
- USS Goss (DE-444)
- USS Kendall C. Campbell (DE-443)
- USS Lyman (DE-302)
- USS Major (DE-796)
- USS Roberts (DE-749)
- USS Ulvert M. Moore (DE-442)
- USS Waterman (DE-740)
- USS Weaver (DE-741)
- USS William Seiverling (DE-441)
- USS Charles Lawrence (DE-53)
- USS John L Williamson (DE-370)

== Frigates ==
- HMS Derg (K257)
- HMAS Gascoyne (K354)
- HMS Woodcock (U90)

== Sloops ==
- HMS Crane (U23)
- HMS Whimbrel (U29)

== Light minelayers ==
- USS Gwin (DM-33)
- USS Thomas E. Fraser (DM-24)

== High speed minesweepers ==
- USS Ellyson (DMS-19)
- USS Fitch (DMS-25)
- USS Gherardi (DMS-30)
- USS Hambleton (DMS-20)
- USS Hopkins (DMS-13)
- USS Jeffers (DMS-27)
- USS Macomb (DMS-23)

== Submarines ==
- USS Archerfish (SS-311)
- USS Cavalla (SS-244)
- USS Gato (SS-212)
- USS Haddo (SS-255)
- USS Hake (SS-256)
- USS Muskallunge (SS-262)
- USS Pilotfish (SS-386)
- USS Razorback (SS-394)
- USS Runner (SS-476)
- USS Sea Cat (SS-399)
- USS Segundo (SS-398)
- USS Tigrone (SS-419)

== Submarine chasers ==
- USS PC-466
- USS PCE(R)-849
- USS PCE(R)-848
- USS PCE(R)-850
- USS PCE(C)-877

== Motor gunboats ==
- USS PGM-16
- USS PGM-26
- USS PGM-32

== Minesweepers ==
- HMAS Ballarat (J184)
- HMAS Cessnock (J175)
- HMAS Ipswich (J186)
- USS Pheasant (AM-61)
- HMAS Pirie (J189)
- USS Pochard (AM-375)
- USS Revenge (AM-110)
- USS Token (AM-126)
- USS Tumult (AM-127)

== Motor minesweepers ==
Numbered ships named and reclassified in 1947

- USS YMS-177
- USS YMS-268
- USS YMS-276
- USS YMS-343
- USS YMS-362
- USS YMS-371
- USS YMS-390
- USS YMS-415
- USS YMS-426
- USS YMS-441
- USS YMS-461
- USS YMS-467

== Auxiliary minelayers ==
- USS Picket (ACM-8)

== Amphibious force flagships ==
- USS Ancon (AGC-4)
- USS Mount Olympus (AGC-8)
- USS Teton (AGC-14)

== High speed transports ==
- USS Barr (APD-39)
- USS Begor (APD 127)
- USS Burke (APD-65)
- USS Gosselin (APD-126)
- USS Hollis (APD-86)
- USS Horace A. Bass (APD-124)
- USS John Q. Roberts (APD-94)
- USS Pavlic (APD-70)
- USS Reeves (APD-52)
- USS Runels (APD-85)
- USS Sims (APD-50)
- USS Wantuck (APD-125)
- USS William J. Pattison (APD-104)

== Tank landing ships ==
- USS LST-567
- USS LST-648
- USS LST-707
- USS LST-717
- USS LST-718
- USS LST-789
- USS LST-846
- USS LST-1083
- USS LST-1139

== Dock landing ships ==
- USS Catamount (LSD-17)
- USS Shadwell (LSD-15)

== Infantry landing craft ==
- USS LCI(L)-438
- USS LCI(L)-441
- USS LCI(L)-450
- USS LCI(L)-457
- USS LCI(L)-458
- USS LCI(L)-469
- USS LCI(L)-726
- USS LCI(L)-752
- USS LCI(L)-798

== Medium landing ships ==
- USS LSM-13
- USS LSM-15
- USS LSM-71
- USS LSM-101
- USS LSM-208
- USS LSM-252
- USS LSM-284
- USS LSM-290
- USS LSM-362
- USS LSM-368
- USS LSM-371
- USS LSM-419
- USS LSM-488
- USS LSM-180 ?

== Vehicle landing ships ==
- USS Monitor (LSV-5)
- USS Ozark (LSV-2)

== Attack transports ==
- USS Bosque (APA-135)
- USS Botetourt (APA-136)
- USS Briscoe (APA-65)
- USS Cecil (APA-96)
- USS Clearfield (APA-142)
- USS Cullman (APA-78)
- USS Darke (APA-159)
- USS Dauphin (APA-97)
- USS Deuel (APA-160)
- USS Dickens (APA-161)
- USS Hansford (APA-106)
- USS Highlands (APA-119)
- USS Lavaca (APA-180)
- USS Lenawee (APA-195)
- USS Mellette (APA-156)
- USS Missoula (APA-211)
- USS Rutland (APA-192)
- USS St. Mary's (APA-126)
- USS Sherburne (APA-205)
- USS Sheridan (APA-51)
- USS Talladega (APA-208)

== Transport ==
- USS General S. D. Sturgis (AP-137)

== Attack cargo ships ==
- USS Libra (AKA-12)
- USS Medea (AKA-31)
- USS Pamina (AKA-34)
- USS Sirona (AKA-43)
- USS Skagit (AKA-105)
- USS Todd (AKA-71)
- USS Tolland (AKA-64)
- USS Waukesha (AKA-84) USS ''Waukesha'' (AKA-84)
- USS Whiteside (AKA-90)
- USS Yancey (AKA-93)

== Cargo ships ==
- USS Lesuth (AK-125)

== Civilian cargo ships (United States) ==
- SS St. Lawrence Victory
- SS Winthrop Victory

== Stores issue ship ==
- USS Cybele (AKS-10)

== Repair ship ==
- USS Delta (AR-9)

== Landing craft repair ship ==
- USS Patroclus (ARL-19)

== Oilers ==
- USS Chiwawa (AO-68)
- USS Mascoma (AO-83)
- USS Neches (AO-47)
- USS Niobrara (AO-72)
- USS Tamalpais (AO-96)
- USS Mattaponi (AO-41)

== Civilian oilers (British) ==
- Carelia
- City of Dieppe
- Dingledale
- Fort Wrangell
- Wave King

== Gasoline tanker ==
- USS Genesee (AOG-8)

== Destroyer tender ==
- USS Piedmont (AD-17)

== Hospital ships ==
- USS Rescue (AH-18)
- USS Benevolence (AH-13)
- USAHS Marigold (U.S. Army)
- HNLMS Tjitjalengka (Dutch)

== Seaplane tenders ==
- USS Cumberland Sound (AV-17)
- USS Hamlin (AV-15)

== Small seaplane tenders ==
- USS Gardiners Bay (AVP-39)
- USS Mackinac (AVP-13)
- USS Suisun (AVP-53)

== Submarine tender ==
- USS Proteus (AS-19)

== Submarine rescue ship ==
- USS Greenlet (ASR-10)

== Fleet ocean tugs ==
- USS Moctobi (ATF-105)
- USS Wenatchee (ATF-118)

== Auxiliary ocean tug ==
- USS ATA-205
