= AT-84 =

AT-84 can be used to mean:

- The AT-84 pistol, a development of the Czech CZ 75, that had been developed in Switzerland by the ITM company who later went out of business.
- USS Cree (ATF-84) a Cherokee-class Fleet Tug, was a ship of the United States Navy
