= USS Wantuck =

1944 Crosley-class high speed transport

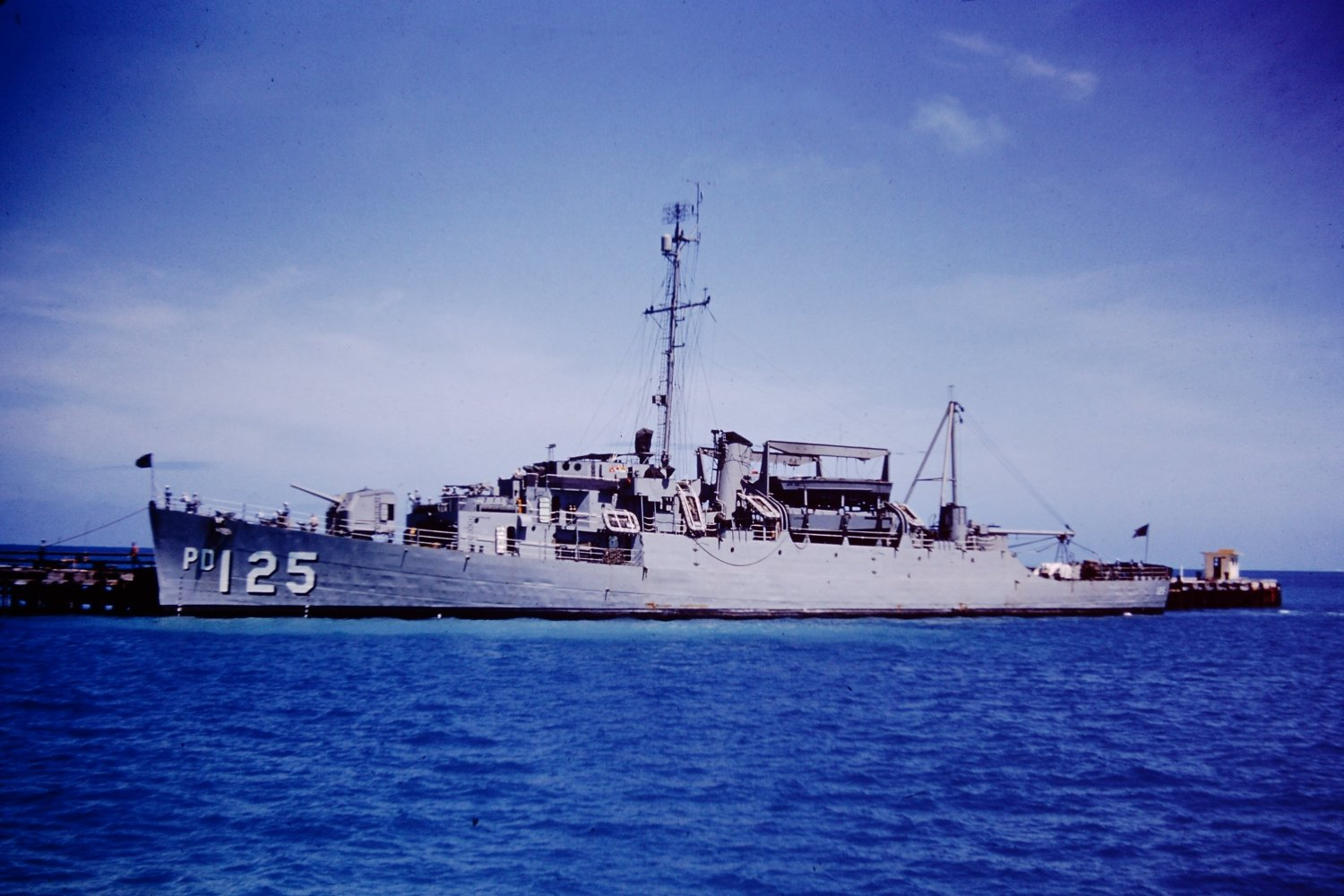
- USS Wantuck (APD-125) in 1952–1953

History

United States
- Name: USS Wantuck
- Namesake: Private John Joseph Wantuck (1923–1943), United States Marine and posthumous recipient of the Navy Cross for his actions on New Georgia in July 1943
- Builder: Bethlehem Shipbuilding Company, Quincy, Massachusetts
- Laid down: 17 August 1944
- Launched: 25 September 1944
- Sponsored by: Miss Mary Wantuck
- Commissioned: 30 December 1944
- Decommissioned: 15 November 1957
- Reclassified: From destroyer escort DE-692 to high-speed transport APD-125 prior to construction
- Stricken: 4 March 1958
- Nickname(s): The Fighting Wantuck
- Honors and awards: One battle star for World War II service; Seven battle stars for Korean War service
- Fate: Sold for scrapping 27 October 1958

General characteristics
- Class & type: Crosley-class high-speed transport
- Displacement: 1,650 tons
- Length: 306 ft 0 in (93.27 m)
- Beam: 37 ft 0 in (11.28 m)
- Draft: 12 ft 7 in (3.84 m)
- Installed power: 12,000 shaft horsepower (8.96 MW)
- Propulsion: 2 Combustion Engineering DR boilers, 2 General Electric turbines, turbo-electric drive, 2 shafts
- Speed: 23.6 knots maximum; 12 knots economical cruising
- Range: 6,000 nautical miles (11,112 kilometers) at 12 knots
- Boats & landing craft carried: 4 x landing craft vehicle and personnel (LCVP)s
- Capacity: 6 × quarter-ton trucks; 2 × 1-ton trucks; 4 × ammunition carts; 4 × pack howitzers<Ammunition 6,000 cubic feet; General cargo 3,500 cubic feet; Gasoline 1,000 cubic feet
- Troops: 162
- Complement: 204
- Armament: 1 × 5 in (130 mm) gun; 6 × 40 mm antiaircraft guns; 6 × single 20 mm anti-aircraft guns; 2 × depth charge racks

USS Wantuck (APD-125) was a United States Navy high-speed transport in commission from 1944 to 1957.

== Namesake ==
John Joseph Wantuck was born on 23 November 1923 in Elmira, New York. He enlisted in the United States Marine Corps on 6 January 1942. After basic training at Marine Corps Recruit Depot Parris Island, South Carolina, he served at Guantanamo Bay, Cuba, from 30 June 1942 until late in 1942.

By 5 December 1942, Private Wantuck was serving in the Solomon Islands where, on 30 June 1943, he went ashore with other Marines at Zanana beach on the island of New Georgia. For two weeks, the troops tried to dislodge the Japanese defenders farther inland near Munda while Wantuck served with the beachhead and supply depot antiaircraft defense unit.

On 17 July 1943, the Japanese mounted a major offensive on American forces. Though eventually stymied in their attempt, they managed to reach the perimeter of the beachhead and Wantuck's position. Using a light machine gun salvaged from the discard pile, Wantuck stuck to his position through the night. The following morning, after the Japanese offensive had been repulsed, he was found dead at his machine gun with evidence in front of him that he had killed 18 to 20 Japanese and had probably wounded many more. He was posthumously awarded the Navy Cross.

== Construction and commissioning ==
Originally projected as a Rudderow-class destroyer escort (DE-692), Wantuck (APD-125) was selected for completion to a modified design as a Crosley Class High-speed Transport (APD), designed for landing and supporting raiding parties while retaining a secondary, destroyer escort-like role of convoy escort. She was laid down on 17 August 1944 at Quincy, Massachusetts, by the Bethlehem Shipbuilding Company. launched on 25 September 1944, sponsored by Miss Mary Wantuck, and commissioned at the Boston Navy Yard at Boston, Massachusetts, on 30 December 1944.

== World War II ==
Wantuck conducted shakedown training along the New England coast and then in the vicinity of Bermuda until 18 February 1945, when she arrived in Hampton Roads, Virginia. On 21 February 1945, she departed Norfolk, Virginia, bound via the Panama Canal, San Diego, California, and Pearl Harbor, Hawaii, for World War II service in the Western Pacific. She arrived at Oahu on 21 March 1945 and got underway again on 2 April 1945. She stopped at Eniwetok for the night of 10 April 1945 – 11 April 1945 and then resumed her voyage. She touched at Guam in the Mariana Islands on 14 April 1945 and then pushed on to the lagoon at Ulithi Atoll. There, she joined a convoy bound for the Ryukyu Islands and arrived in Kerama Retto near Okinawa on 21 April 1945. She remained at Okinawa screening the American ships there until 30 April 1945 when she got underway in the screen of a convoy containing 16 other ships bound for Saipan in the Marianas.

However, after seeing them safely out of the Ryukyus, she returned to Okinawa and resumed her duty screening the ships remaining at Kerama Retto. On 4 May 1945, she helped repulse an enemy air attack but claimed no kills or assists for herself. Later that day, when a kamikaze struck light cruiser USS Birmingham (CL-62), Wantuck went to the aid of the stricken cruiser. On 5 May 1945, she departed Okinawa in company with damaged Birmingham and destroyer-minesweeper USS Rodman (DMS-21) and set a course for Ulithi. En route, however, the ships received orders diverting them to Guam in the Marianas and, for the next two months, Wantuck made regular shuttle runs escorting convoys between Guam and Okinawa. That particular routine ended on 5 July 1945 when she departed Guam for Leyte in the Philippines. She entered San Pedro Bay, Leyte, on 8 July 1945 and then headed back to Okinawa. She served in the Ryukyus for more than a month, during which the surrender of Japan ended World War II on 15 August 1945.

=== World War II honors and awards ===
Wantuck earned one battle star during World War II, for the Okinawa Gunto operation (Assault and Occupation of Okinawa Gunto), covering various dates from 21 April 1945 to 15 August 1945.

== Post-World War II ==
With the war over, Wantuck embarked troops for the planned occupation of Japan and joined the United States Third Fleet on 18 August 1945. She entered Tokyo Bay on 27 August 1945 and disembarked her share of the occupation force. On 30 August 1945, she moved to the Yokosuka Naval Station where she began loading Allied prisoners of war from the hospital ship USS Benevolence (AH-13). During the first week of September 1945, she made calls at various Japanese ports embarking former Allied prisoners of war. On 7 September 1945, she transferred her passengers to destroyer USS Lansdowne (DD-486). On 9 September 1945, Wantuck took several British prisoners on board and the next day transferred them to a Royal Navy destroyer. She continued to shuttle former prisoners of war between locations in Japan until 2 October 1945, at which time she headed for the Marianas.

Wantuck arrived at Guam on 5 October 1945 and remained there until 19 October 1945 when she headed back to Yokosuka, Japan. She reached Yokosuka on 22 October 1945, but got underway again on 30 October 1945. Steaming via Guam, she arrived at Manus Island in the Admiralty Islands on 8 November 1945 but that same day headed for Rabaul. where she arrived on 9 November 1945. On 18 November 1945 she began a circuitous voyage back to the United States.

After stops at Manus, Guam, Eniwetok, and Pearl Harbor, Wantuck reached San Francisco. California, on 21 December 1945. The ship was delayed for weeks outside of San Francisco Bay because of a pilot strike. But the ship's captain, Lt Commander Jack Murphy, broke protocol and brought the ship to port without a pilot.

On 3 January 1946, Wantuck entered the Mare Island Naval Shipyard at Vallejo, California, for an overhaul which she completed on 10 March 1946. That same day, she sailed for her new home port, San Diego. For almost a year, she operated out of San Diego, primarily conducting amphibious warfare exercises at San Clemente Island.

On 24 February 1947, Wantuck departed San Diego for a three-month voyage to the Western Pacific. Her ports of call included Pearl Harbor, Kwajalein, Manus, and Guam. She returned to San Diego on 19 June 1947 and resumed normal operations out of that port, which she continued until the beginning of 1948.

On 15 January 1948, Wantuck again stood out of San Diego for a voyage to the Western Pacific. After stops at Pearl Harbor, Kwajalein, and Guam, she arrived in Qingdao, China, on 15 February 1948. For the next six months, she cruised along the China coast, observing conditions during the latter stages of the Chinese Civil War, and transported Chinese Nationalist troops to various locations in support of their efforts against the Chinese Communists. On 16 August 1948, Wantuck departed Qingdao to return to the United States. She made stops at Guam, Kwajalein, and Pearl Harbor before reentering San Diego on 9 September 1948 and resumed normal United States West Coast operations.

Early in 1950, Wantuck made a round-trip voyage to Alaskan waters and back to San Diego before departing San Diego on 1 May 1950 to deploy overseas once more. She stopped at Pearl Harbor from 9 May 1950 to 12 May 1950 and then continued her voyage west. After stops in the Mariana and Philippine Islands, Wantuck arrived at Hong Kong on 7 June 1950.

== Korean War ==
While Wantuck was at Hong Kong, war erupted in Korea when communist North Korean troops invaded South Korea on 25 June 1950, beginning the Korean War. Whether or not this event prompted Wantuck's unusually long stay – three months – in a liberty port for a warship is not clear, but she did not leave Hong Kong until 6 September 1950. From there, the ship moved to Sasebo, Japan, where she arrived on 8 September 1950.

On 10 September 1950, Wantuck was in the Korean combat zone at the port of Pusan preparing for the amphibious assault at Inchon. She departed Pusan on 13 September 1950 with elements of the 3rd Battalion, 5th Marine Regiment, embarked. Early on the morning of 15 September 1950, Wantuck was off Wolmi-do, an island just off Inchon. Her troops stormed ashore on the island and quickly consolidated their position in preparation for the second phase of the operation, the invasion of Inchon itself scheduled for that afternoon. Wantuck remained at Inchon supporting the consolidation and expansion of the beachhead until 26 September 1950, at which time she returned to Yokosuka, Japan.

Wantuck returned to Korea early in October 1950 with Royal Marine Commandos embarked. In cooperation with high-speed transport USS Horace A. Bass (APD-124) and supported by destroyer USS De Haven (DD-727), she executed a series of raids near Wonsan to disrupt North Korean transportation facilities – primarily rail lines – to support a scheduled amphibious attack on Wonsan. Wantuck returned to Japan on 10 October 1950 and the Wonsan amphibious assault operation was obviated by the fact that Republic of Korea (ROK) troops entered Wonsan from landward on 11 October 1950.

Wantuck did not arrive back in Korean waters again until 20 October 1950, once again at Wonsan. By that time, however, United Nations efforts to reopen the port of Wonsan were well advanced, and Wantuck saw no further combat duty during that deployment. She returned to Yokosuka on 25 November 1950 and, on 28 November 1950, headed back to the United States. After stops at Midway Atoll and Pearl Harbor, she arrived in San Diego on 15 December 1950.

Wantuck spent almost eight months conducting normal operations along the United States West Coast out of San Diego. Then on 23 July 1951, she headed westward once again for the Far East. Following calls at Pearl Harbor and at Midway Atoll, she arrived in Yokosuka on 22 August 1951. By the time of Wantuck's return to Korea, the war had degenerated into a stalemate on land with the principals locked in armistice negotiations and jockeying for military advantage at the bargaining table. At sea, the naval war had become almost purely one of aircraft carrier operations with planes interdicting communist supply routes and hitting strategic targets in North Korea. Wantuck resumed duty with Task Force 90, the Amphibious Force, and consequently took little active part in the conflict from that point. In fact, during her 1951-1952 deployment, she did not even qualify for the Korean Service Medal, though she did visit Korean ports on occasion, particularly Inchon and Pusan. She departed Yokosuka late in March 1952 and, after a stop at Oahu along the way, reentered San Diego on 19 April 1952.

Wantuck remained on the U.S. West Coast for almost a year. A paucity of movements on her part – limited to one move to San Francisco in September 1952 for a three-month stay before returning to San Diego in December 1952 – suggests a period of extensive repairs probably including an overhaul. In any event, she departed San Diego again on 7 March 1953 and steamed via Pearl Harbor to the Far East. She arrived in Yokosuka on 30 March 1953 and, though she patrolled extensively in Korean waters, her operations were essentially as peaceful as they had been during the previous deployment. In July 1953, the signing of the armistice made those peaceful conditions permanent.

=== Korean War honors and awards ===
Wantuck earned seven battle stars during the Korean War, for the following campaigns:

- North Korean Aggression, 9 September 1950 – 14 September 1950 and 18 September 1950 – 2 November 1950
- Communist China Aggression, 3 November 1950 – 21 November 1950
- Inchon Landing. 15 September 1950 – 17 September 1950
- United Nations Summer-Fall Offensive, 6 September 1951 – 10 September 1951 and 24 September 1951 – 8 October 1951
- Second Korean Winter, 5 December 1951 – 6 December 1951, 17 December 1951 – 18 December 1951, 28 December 1951 – 30 December 1951, 21 January 1952 – 27 January 1952, and 19 March 1952 – 27 March 1952
- Third Korean Winter, 8 April 1953 – 20 April 1953
- Korean Summer-Fall 1953, 1 June 1953 – 11 June 1953, 15 June 1953 – 19 June 1953, and 27 July 1953

== Post-Korean War ==
Wantuck conducted patrols, training exercises, and port visits for the remainder of her 1953 Korean deployment. On 9 November 1953, she departed Yokosuka to return to the United States. En route she stopped at Midway and Pearl Harbor before arriving in San Diego on 25 November 1953.

Over the remaining four years of her active career, Wantuck made two more cruises to the Far East, one in 1954—during which she operated out of Hong Kong—and another in 1955. In 1956 and the first half of 1957, her zone of operations centered in two areas, the California coast and the waters around Alaska.

== Collision with USS Lenawee ==
In mid-August 1957, Wantuck got underway from San Diego for Hawaii on the first leg of a voyage to Japan. She was about 180 nautical miles (333 kilometers) from San Diego on a moonless and starless night when at 0318 hours on 15 August 1957 the attack transport USS Lenawee (APA-195) rammed her on the port side between the No.1 boiler room and No. 1 engine room, almost tearing Wantuck in half, the impact being powerful enough to bring her forward momentum to an immediate stop and shove her laterally to starboard. Wantuck suffered two men killed—one who drowned in the flooding engine room and another scalded by high-pressure steam—and five injured, all burned. The submarine rescue ship USS Florikan (ASR-9) and fleet ocean tug USS Cree (ATF-84) came to Wantuck's aid, while Lenawee took some of Wantuck's injured men aboard and proceeded to Pearl Harbor.

Wantuck arrived in San Diego under tow on the evening of 16 August 1957.

== Decommissioning and disposal ==
Deemed not worth repairing, Wantuck was decommissioned at San Diego on 15 November 1957 and berthed there with the Pacific Reserve Fleet. Her name was struck from the Navy List on 4 March 1958, and she was sold on 27 October 1958 to the Sundfelt Equipment Company, Inc., of Wilmington, California. Presumably she was scrapped.
