= USS Lenawee =

Attack transport ship in United States Navy

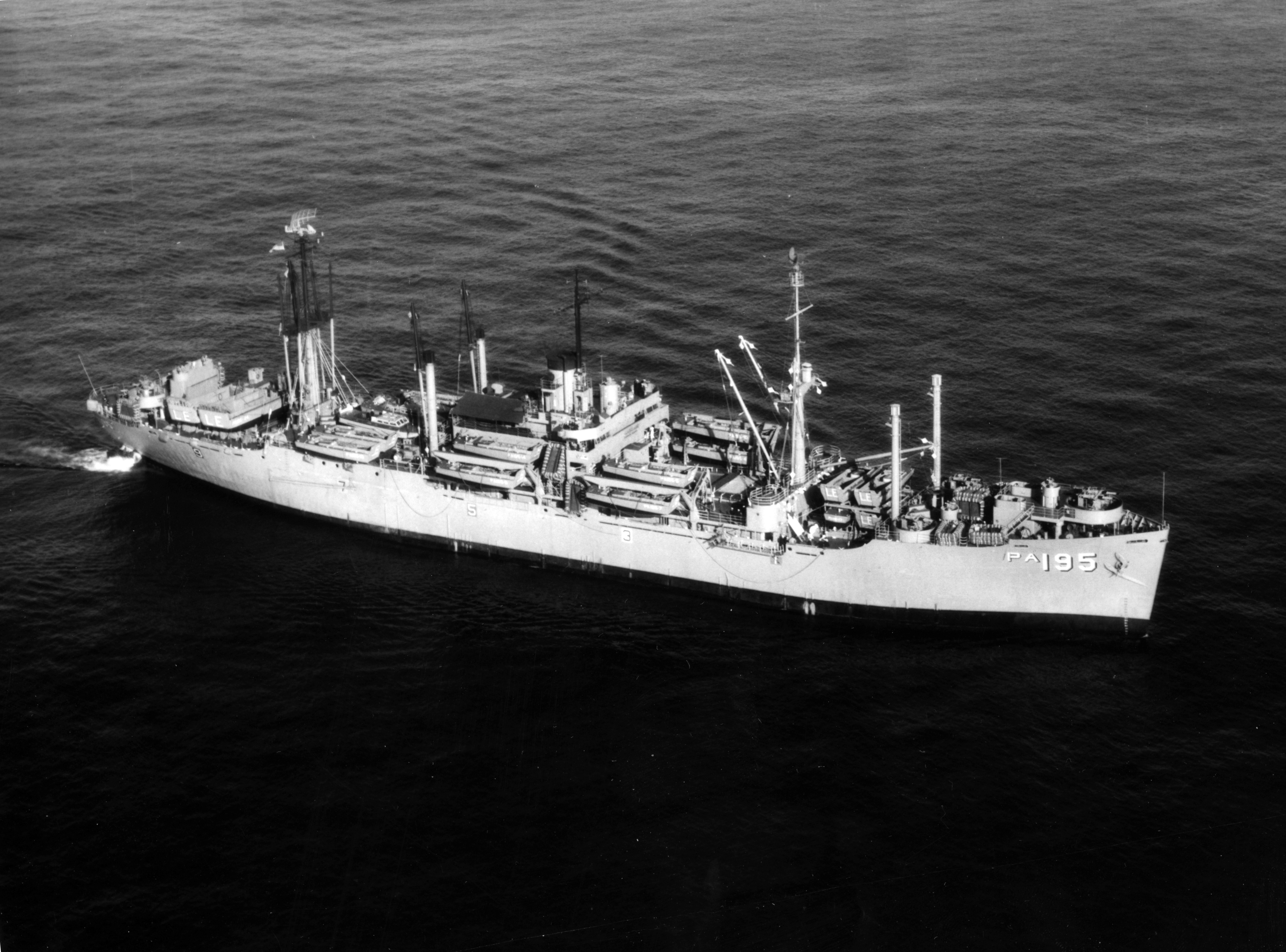

History

United States
- Namesake: Lenawee County, Michigan
- Builder: Kaiser Shipbuilding
- Laid down: 26 May 1944
- Launched: 11 September 1944
- Commissioned: 11 October 1944
- Decommissioned: 20 June 1967
- In service: 30 September 1950
- Out of service: 3 August 1946
- Stricken: 30 June 1968
- Honors and awards: 5 Battle stars
- Fate: Scrapped 1975
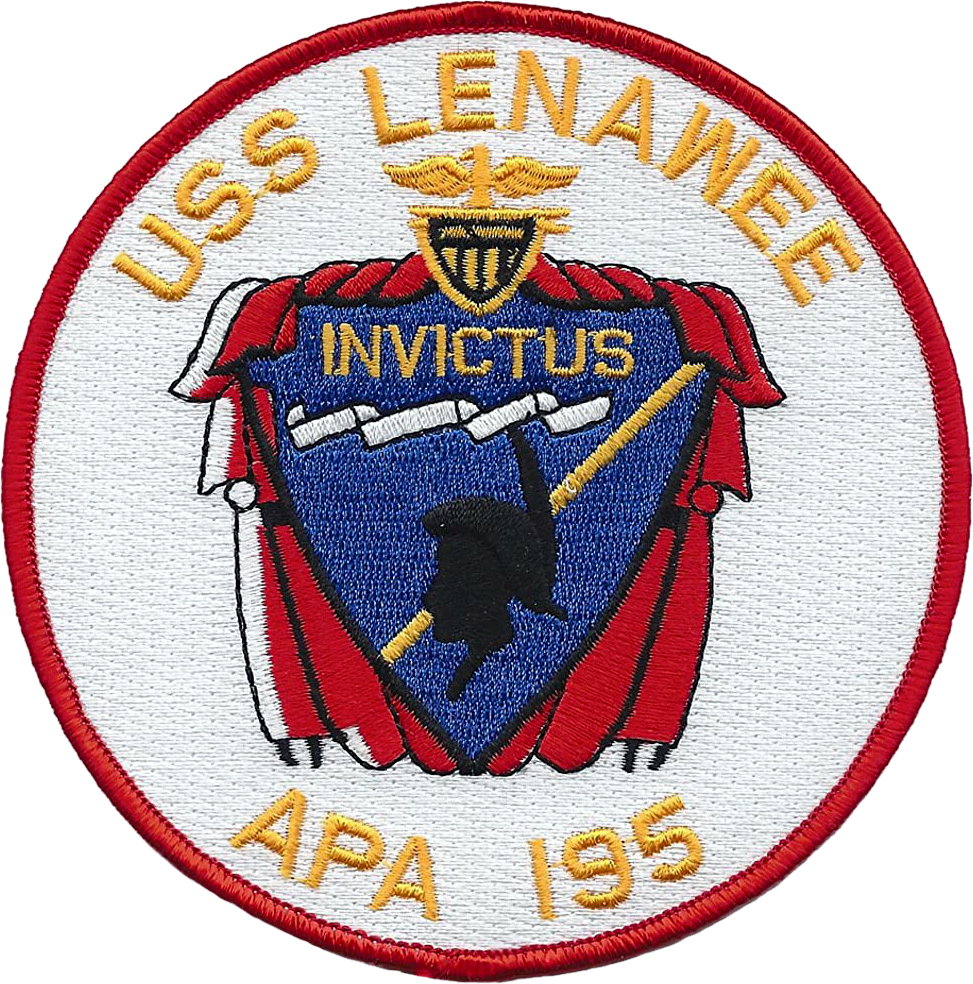
- Badge

General characteristics
- Class & type: Haskell-class attack transport
- Displacement: 6,873 tons
- Length: 455 ft (139 m)
- Beam: 62 ft (19 m)
- Draft: 24 ft (7.3 m)
- Propulsion: Oil Fired Steam Turbine; 1 Shaft
- Speed: 17 knots
- Boats & landing craft carried: 26
- Complement: 56 Officers, 480 Enlisted
- Armament: 1 5"/38 gun; 12 × 40-mm (1x4, 4x2); 10 20-mm single mounts

USS Lenawee (APA-195) was a Haskell-class attack transport in service with the United States Navy from 1944 to 1946 and from 1950 to 1967. She was scrapped in 1975.

== History ==
Lenawee was a Victory ship design, VC2-S-AP5 and was named after Lenawee County, Michigan, USA. She was laid down on 26 May 1944 by Kaiser Shipbuilding Company, Vancouver, Washington, under Maritime Commission contract; launched on 11 September 1944; sponsored by Mrs. Olaf Haugen; and commissioned on 11 October 1944.

=== World War II service ===
Built to transport assault troops to hostile shores, Lenawee picked up her complement of landing craft at San Francisco and departed 26 November 1944 for the Pacific theater. Following amphibious training in the Hawaiian Islands, she sailed 27 January 1945 for Saipan. In the Marianas the final rehearsals for her entrance into the battle zone were held, and 1,503 troops of the 5th Marines and the 62nd Naval Construction Battalion embarked. After a 3-day voyage, she arrived at Iwo Jima on 19 February; her boats helped place the first wave of Marines ashore before debarking her own troops 3 days later. Withdrawn on the 27th, she retired to Guam to discharge Marine casualties and prepare for the final large-scale amphibious operation of World War II.

Sailing south to Espiritu Santo, she embarked over 1,000 troops of the Army 27th Division to reinforce the Okinawa invasion forces. Landing troops and cargo each day and retiring to open sea each night, she suffered no damage from kamikaze attacks during the stay in the area 9 to 14 April.

As part of Commodore J. B. McGovern's Transport Squadron 16, she transported troops from the Philippines to Japan and was present in Tokyo Bay with 1,135 troops of the 1st Cavalry when the Japanese surrendered 2 September. Returning to her home port, San Francisco, 31 October, Lenawee made two "Magic Carpet" voyages to the western Pacific before decommissioning at Stockton, California, 3 August 1946, and entering the Reserve Fleet.

=== Korean War ===
The outbreak of the Korean War caused her to recommission 30 September 1950. With San Diego as her home port, she operated part of each year, except 1952 and 1956, in the Far East. Her first voyage began 22 March 1951 when she departed for Yokosuka, Japan. Operating mainly among the Japanese Islands, she twice transported men and supplies to the Korean theater before returning home 27 November. Again in May 1953 Lenawee returned to transport duties in Korean waters and was at Inchon in July when the final truce was signed.

The Chinese offshore islands and Vietnam proved to be the new crisis areas in the Far East. Following a period of amphibious training early in December 1954 with Korean marines, Lenawee joined in the evacuation of Chinese Nationalist civilians and troops from the Tachen Islands to Formosa, on her last trip carrying U.S. Ambassador to China Karl L. Ranking for a first hand observation.

Even without such crises, the Navy never loses its alertness, continually training for any eventuality. Each year amphibious operations were held with marines either off the California coast, in the Hawaiians, or elsewhere in the Pacific. Joint exercises were also held with Philippine troops in 1957, with British forces off Borneo in 1959, with Korean marines in a cold weather operation in 1962, and in 1965 with units of the Royal Thai Navy.

=== Collision with USS Wantuck ===
In mid-August 1957, USS Wantuck (APD-125) got underway from San Diego for Hawaii on the first leg of a voyage to Japan. She was about 180 nautical miles (333 kilometers) from San Diego on a moonless and starless night when at 0318 hours on 15 August 1957 Lenawee rammed her on the port side between the No.1 boiler room and No. 1 engine room, almost tearing Wantuck in half, the impact being powerful enough to bring her forward momentum to an immediate stop and shove her laterally to starboard. Wantuck suffered two men killed—one who drowned in the flooding engine room and another scalded by high-pressure steam—and five injured, all burned. The submarine rescue ship USS Florikan (ASR-9) and fleet ocean tug USS Cree (ATF-84) came to Wantuck‍ 's aid, while Lenawee took some of Wantuck‍s injured men aboard and proceeded to Pearl Harbor. Wantuck arrived in San Diego under tow on the evening of 16 August 1957. Deemed not worth repairing, Wantuck was decommissioned at San Diego on 15 November 1957 and berthed there with the Pacific Reserve Fleet. Her name was struck from the Navy List on 4 March 1958.

=== Vietnam War ===
Beginning in 1963 the South China Sea became a regular scene of operations for Lenawee. Following the Tonkin Gulf Resolution in August 1964, she prepared for her 10th Far Eastern tour since recommissioning. The people-to-people project was not neglected as a result of this new crisis, for the ship carried 10,000 pounds of textbooks and medical supplies to the Philippines and Vietnam after she departed San Diego 7 November 1964. With TF 76, she stood-by laden with marines in the South China Sea from 12 December until 10 April 1965, when 3rd Division Marines were landed at Da Nang. Five days later, her boats landed men of the 4th Marines at Hue. Reloading at Okinawa, Lenawee returned to debark additional troops of the 4th Marines in an assault landing at Chu Lai 7 May. On the 24th she brought 2,001 tons of ammunition to these same men. One month later she was en route for a short stay in her home port. On 9 August 1965 she departed California with Battalion Landing Team 1/1 on the first nonstop voyage made by an attack transport direct to Da Nang, arriving the 28th. Returning to San Diego 28 October, Lenawee spent the remainder of the year and the first 8 months of 1966 off the West Coast. She conducted type training and participated in various amphibious exercises until departing on her last deployment 4 September 1966.

Lenawee carried marines to Okinawa, successfully weathering typhoon "Ida" on the way; then, after a stop in Japan, transported Republic of Korea troops from Pusan to Da Nang. She ferried U.S. servicemen from Okinawa to Vietnam and back in December, before returning to the West Coast, arriving at San Diego 8 January 1967 to begin preparations for inactivation.

=== Fate ===
Lenawee decommissioned 20 June 1967. She was berthed in the Maritime Administration's National Defense Reserve Fleet at Suisun Bay, California, on 29 June 1967. Title was transferred to the Maritime Administration on 23 April 1968, and she was struck from the Naval Vessel Register 30 June 1968. Ex-Lenawee was sold for $129,089.78 to Nicolai Joffe Corp. for scrapping on 17 August 1975. At 1337 PDT, on 28 July 1975 she was withdrawn from the Reserve Fleet and sent to the breaker's yard.

== Awards ==
Lenawee received two battle stars for World War II service and three for Korean service.
