= USS Medea =

Cargo ship of the United States Navy

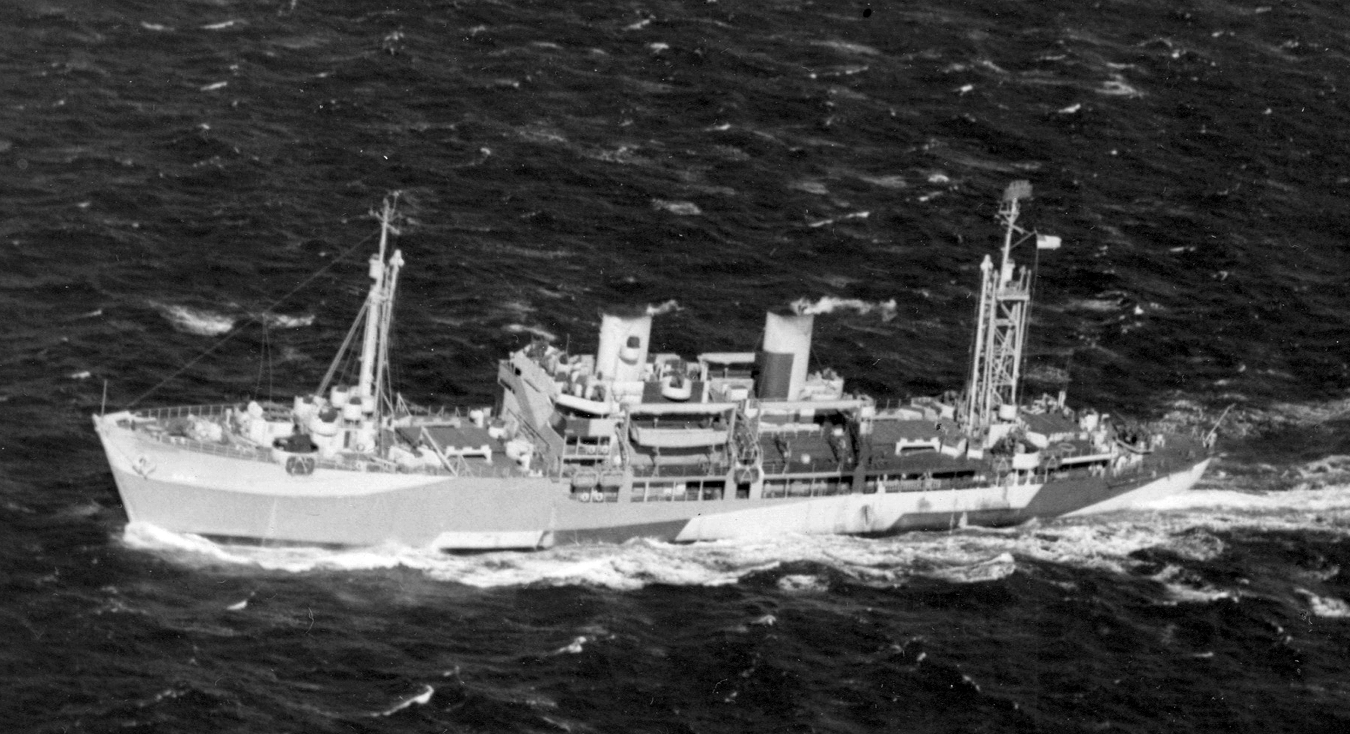

History

United States
- Name: USS Medea
- Namesake: The asteroid Medea
- Builder: Walsh-Kaiser Company, Providence, Rhode Island
- Laid down: 9 August 1944
- Launched: 30 November 1944
- Commissioned: 10 January 1945
- Decommissioned: 24 April 1946
- Stricken: 15 October 1946
- Honours and awards: 1 battle star (WWII)
- Fate: Sold for scrapping, 1964

General characteristics
- Class & type: Artemis-class attack cargo ship
- Type: S4–SE2–BE1
- Displacement: 4,087 long tons (4,153 t) light; 7,080 long tons (7,194 t) full
- Length: 426 ft (130 m)
- Beam: 58 ft (18 m)
- Draft: 16 ft (4.9 m)
- Speed: 16.9 knots (31.3 km/h; 19.4 mph)
- Complement: 303 officers and enlisted
- Armament: 1 × 5"/38 caliber gun mount; 4 × twin 40 mm gun mounts; 10 × 20 mm gun mounts

USS Medea (AKA-31) was an Artemis-class attack cargo ship in service with the United States Navy from 1944 to 1946. She was scrapped in 1964–1965.

== History ==
Medea (AKA-31) was named after the minor planet 212 Medea, which in turn was named for a mythical enchantress who helped Jason win the Golden Fleece. She was laid down under Maritime Commission contract 5 August 1944, by Walsh–Kaiser Co., Inc., Providence, RI; launched 30 November 1944; sponsored by Mrs. A. C. Clarke; and commissioned 10 January 1945.

Following shakedown in Chesapeake Bay, Medea loaded cargo at Hampton Roads, and steamed to Hawaii, arriving Pearl Harbor 3 March 1945. Departing Honolulu 6 April, she operated in the Marianas for the next two months, before embarking troops for Okinawa. She arrived off the Hagushi beaches, Okinawa 10 June, and spent the next nine days discharging troops and cargo. After the cessation of hostilities on 15 August, she carried occupation troops from the Philippines to Japan until November, when she reported for duty with the "Magic Carpet" fleet.

Medea decommissioned in the 8th Naval District, headquartered at New Orleans, 24 April 1946. She was struck from the Naval Register 15 October, and transferred to the War Shipping Administration 29 October. She was finally scrapped in 1964–1965.

== Awards ==
Medea received one battle star for World War II service.
