= USS LST-567 =

US Navy tank landing ship

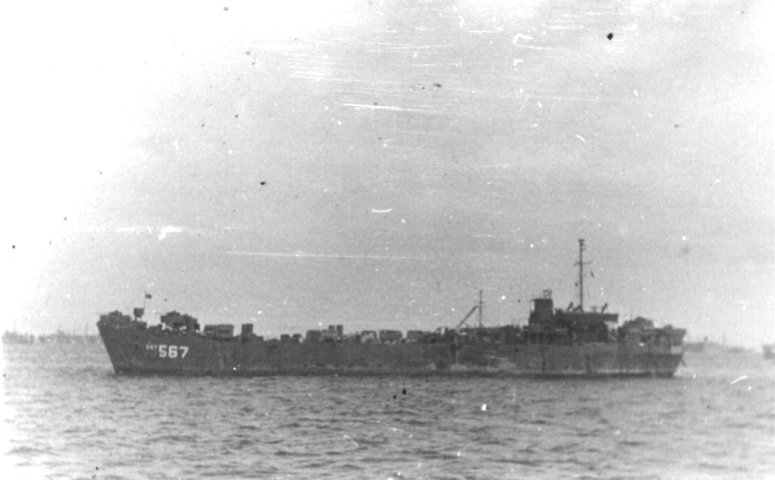
- USS LST-567

History

United States
- Name: USS LST-567
- Builder: Missouri Valley Bridge and Iron Company, Evansville, Indiana
- Laid down: 20 March 1944
- Launched: 15 May 1944
- Sponsored by: Miss Elizabeth Funkey
- Commissioned: 1 June 1944
- Decommissioned: 28 January 1946
- Stricken: 31 October 1947
- Honors and awards: Three battle stars for World War II
- Fate: Sold for scrapping 24 May 1948

General characteristics
- Class & type: LST-542-class tank landing ship
- Displacement: 1,780 long tons (1,809 t) light; 4,080 long tons (4,145 t) full load
- Length: 328 ft (100 m)
- Beam: 50 ft (15 m)
- Draft: Unloaded 2 ft 4 in (0.71 m) forward; 7 ft 6 in (2.29 m) aft; Full load: 8 ft 2 in (2.49 m) forward; 14 ft 1 in (4.29 m) aft
- Installed power: 1,800 horsepower (1.34 megawatts)
- Propulsion: Two 900-horsepower (0.67-megawatt) General Motors 12-567 diesel engines, two shafts, twin rudders
- Speed: 11.6 knots (21.5 km/h; 13.3 mph)
- Range: 24,000 nautical miles (44,448 kilometerss) at 9 knots while displacing 3,960 tons
- Boats & landing craft carried: 2 x LCVPs
- Capacity: 1,600-1,900 tons cargo depending on mission
- Troops: Approximately 130 officers and enlisted men
- Complement: 12 officers, 106 enlisted men
- Armament: 2 × twin 40 mm guns; 4 × single 40-millimeter guns; 12 × 20 mm guns

USS LST-567 was a United States Navy LST-542-class tank landing ship in commission from 1944 to 1946.

== Construction and commissioning ==
LST-567 was laid down on 20 March 1944 at Evansville, Indiana, by the Missouri Valley Bridge and Iron Company. She was launched on 15 May 1944, sponsored by Miss Elizabeth Funkey, and commissioned on 1 June 1944.

== Service history ==
During World War II, LST-567 was assigned to the Pacific Theater of Operations. She took part in the Philippines campaign, participating in the landings on Leyte in October and November 1944 and the landings at Lingayen Gulf in January 1945. She then took part in the invasion and occupation of Okinawa Gunto in June 1945.

Following the war, LST-567 performed occupation duty in the Far East until early January 1946, when she departed for the United States.

== Decommissioning and disposal ==
After returning to the United States, LST-567 was decommissioned on 28 January 1946 and stricken from the Navy List on 31 October 1947. She was sold for scrapping on 24 May 1948 to the Bethlehem Steel Corporation of Bethlehem, Pennsylvania.

== Honors and awards ==
LST-567 earned three battle stars for her World War II service.
