= USS Tumult =

Minesweeper of the United States Navy

History

United States
- Name: USS Tumult
- Builder: Gulf Shipbuilding Corporation, Chickasaw, Alabama
- Laid down: 21 July 1941
- Launched: 19 April 1942
- Commissioned: 27 February 1943
- Decommissioned: 21 September 1954
- Reclassified: MSF-127, 7 February 1955
- Stricken: 1 May 1967
- Honours and awards: 5 battle stars (World War II)
- Fate: Sold for scrap

General characteristics
- Class & type: Auk-class minesweeper
- Displacement: 890 long tons (904 t)
- Length: 221 ft 3 in (67.44 m)
- Beam: 32 ft (9.8 m)
- Draft: 10 ft 9 in (3.28 m)
- Speed: 18 knots (33 km/h; 21 mph)
- Complement: 100 officers and enlisted
- Armament: 2 × 3"/50 caliber gun; 6 × 20 mm guns; 2 × .30 cal (7.62 mm) machine guns; 2 × Depth charge tracks; 4 × depth charge projectors

USS Tumult (AM-127) was an Auk-class minesweeper acquired by the United States Navy for the dangerous task of removing mines from minefields laid in the water to prevent ships from passing.

Tumult was laid down on 21 July 1941 at Chickasaw, Alabama, by the Gulf Shipbuilding Corp.; launched on 19 April 1942; sponsored by Mrs. D. M. Pierce; and commissioned on 27 February 1943.

== US East Coast, 1943 ==
Following tests and fitting out, Tumult began escort duties on the Eastern Sea Frontier late in March 1943. In April, the new minesweeper participated in anti-submarine warfare training out of Key West, Florida. On the 21st, she began minesweeping, fueling, and anti-aircraft drills in company with other minesweepers on Virginia's York River. Then, on the 24th, she got underway for Bermuda and searched en route for survivors from the freighter SS Santa Catalina which had been sunk. Tumult discovered debris and a life ring on the 26th but failed to find any survivors.

Following repairs at Norfolk, Virginia, the minesweeper escorted a group of small coastal transports which departed from Charleston, South Carolina, on 15 May. The short voyage to Key West, Florida afforded her practice in escort procedures.

== Pacific operations, 1943–1945 ==
=== Convoy escort ===
Tumult got underway again on the 20th and set her course for the Panama Canal and the Pacific. Early in June, she paused briefly at Manzanillo, Mexico, to obtain emergency medical aid for a member of her crew and then continued on to San Diego, California. Provisioning, exercises, and repairs there occupied the remainder of June and most of July. On 21 July, the minesweeper got underway for San Francisco where she remained throughout most of August. On the 28th, she finally set course for the Pacific war zone, escorting a convoy of vulnerable, slow-moving, cargo vessels which pulled a section of portable dock AFDB-1. Tumult spent the entire month of September shepherding these awkward charges across the Pacific. On 2 October, having safely delivered the convoy, Tumult anchored at Espiritu Santo.

Throughout the remainder of 1943 and into 1944, Tumult escorted convoys among the Solomon Islands and between the Solomons and New Caledonia. Short periods of availability at Espiritu Santo and mine-sweeping exercises off Savo Island varied the sweeper's duties until late in June when she departed Port Purvis on Florida Island in the Solomons for a week of recreation and rehabilitation in Sydney, Australia. In July, she returned to the Solomons to resume the familiar routine of convoy protection.

=== Invasion of Peleliu ===
Late in August, she participated in tactical maneuvers and minesweeping exercises in the Russells preparing for the impending assault on the Palaus. Underway from Guadalcanal on 8 September, Tumult screened her task group on station until her arrival off Peleliu on D-Day, 15 September 1944. Early that morning, she began sweeps off Angaur Island and, during the days which followed, alternated minesweeping duties with patrolling and screening of the transport area.

=== Invasion of Ulithi ===
Tumult got underway from Peleliu on 19 September and set her course for yet another island strike — the assault on Ulithi. She arrived off the atoll on 21 September and, through the following days, swept for mines to prepare this prize anchorage for use by American vessels. On 23 September, the day of the unopposed landings, she swept 21 mines before a contact mine fouled her gear and forced her to retire to the disposal area to rid herself of both her port sweeping gear and the otherwise inextricable, offending mine. Tumult departed Ulithi on 25 September with a convoy of transports bound for Dutch New Guinea.

=== Invasion of the Philippines ===
After repairs, she departed Manus on 10 October 1944 with a sweeping unit of task group TG 77.5 bound for the Philippines. On the 17th, Tumult began sweeping Surigao Strait in gale-force winds; and on the 19th — the day before General MacArthur's landing on Leyte— she swept 26 contact mines which attested to the thoroughness of the Japanese defenses. On the 23rd, she anchored in the transport area of Leyte Gulf.

In the days that followed, Japanese air raiders kept anti-aircraft crews busy; and, on the 25th, Tumult's gunners scored a hit on a "Val" which went down in flames two miles (3.2 km) off the port quarter. The next day, Tumult fired on 11 Japanese planes and had reason to thank her luck as a bomb dropped 300 yards (270 m) away off her starboard bow. Later that day, she splashed a "Sally" which went down one mile (1.6 km) off her port bow. On the 28th, Tumult got underway for Manus.

After repairs at Seeadler Harbor, she set her course eastward and steamed via Pearl Harbor and San Francisco, California to Portland, Oregon, and arrived there on 7 December. Tumult underwent overhaul and shakedown on the U.S. West Coast; then departed Long Beach, California, on 23 April 1945.

=== Okinawa operations ===
She arrived at Pearl Harbor on 1 May for a week of exercises before rendezvousing with a convoy bound for the Marianas. On 22 May, she arrived at Guam but soon was underway again with a slow-moving convoy steaming for Okinawa. On 4 June, typhoon winds forced the convoy, whose tows and tugs were experiencing extreme difficulty in holding course, to disperse. Two days elapsed before rendezvous with the last of the stragglers had been achieved. On the 9th, Tumult screened the convoy as it entered Buckner Bay, and then she proceeded on to Kerama Retto.

On the 11th, the minesweeper began patrolling off Okinawa. As she steamed on station on the evening of the 16th, explosions rent the night, and fire illuminated the horizon some eight miles (13 km) away as destroyer Twiggs (DD-591) went down, the victim of a kamikaze. Tumult continued on picket off Okinawa until 30 June, with only brief respites at Kerama Retto for availability and provisioning. She then participated in four days of exercises before setting course for sweeps in area "Juneau" of the East China Sea. On 17 July, Tumult was provisioning at Buckner Bay when a typhoon warning prompted her to depart on short notice, leaving behind her navigator and engineering officer as she headed out to sea. For three days, she steamed northward outdistancing the typhoon; then returned to Okinawa to complete her interrupted logistic tasks.

== Post-war operations, 1945–1954 ==
=== In Japanese waters ===
As the war ended, Tumult was sweeping in area "Skagway" off the coast of Kyūshū, Japan. A few days later, she rendezvoused with the U.S. 3rd Fleet as it steamed northward. On 28 August, Tumult and three other minesweepers swept past the headlands of Tokyo Bay and into the harbor. The once busy Japanese port presented a bleak and unnervingly quiet appearance. Only a single battleship, Nagato, and a few smaller vessels remained; and a lone beached destroyer added to the desolation of the scene, as the victorious American ships entered the harbor.

Tumult immediately began sweeping the anchorage and, in the following days, helped to remove minefields at the harbor entrance. During most of September, she swept off the eastern coast of Honshū, clearing Sagami Wan and Ishinomaki Wan. While the minesweeper was anchored in Tokyo harbor on the 27th, a motor whale-boat capsized nearby in heavy seas. Tumult launched her own whaleboat and rescued 20 survivors from the stormy waters of the bay. Early in October, the minesweeper sat out a typhoon in Tokyo Bay; then got underway for Sasebo where she stopped before departing Japan for sweeps in area "Klondike" in the Yellow Sea.

On 30 October, accidental engine room flooding left one of Tumult's main propulsion motors inoperable, stopping her port shaft. On the first day of November, she headed for Japan and underwent repairs at Sasebo until the end of the year. In January 1946, she steamed via Eniwetok and Pearl Harbor to San Pedro, California, arriving there on 15 February. She departed the west coast on 3 March and proceeded via the Panama Canal to Charleston, South Carolina.

=== Atlantic ===
In June, she made a training cruise out of Jacksonville, Florida, and spent the rest of 1946 and most of 1947 operating along the east coast. In November of the latter year, she varied her peacetime duties with mine-sweeping off Naval Station Argentia, Newfoundland.

From January 1948 until July 1952, Tumult continued to operate out of Atlantic ports and made three Caribbean cruises. On 25 August 1952, Tumult departed Charleston with Minesweeper Division 82, setting her course for the British Isles. In ensuing months, the veteran minesweeper participated in NATO exercises and visited many Mediterranean ports. She returned to Charleston on 7 February 1953 and resumed her duties out of east coast ports, which she continued until 21 July 1954 when she arrived at Orange, Texas, for inactivation.

== Decommissioning and sale ==
Two months later, on 21 September 1954, Tumult was placed out of commission. On 7 February 1955, she was redesignated a steel-hulled fleet minesweeper (MSF-127). Her name was struck from the Navy list on 1 May 1967. Her hulk was later purchased by the Southern Scrap Metal Co., Ltd., New Orleans, Louisiana.

== Awards ==
Tumult received five battle stars for World War II service.
