= USS Cecil =

United States Navy WWII-era attack transport ship

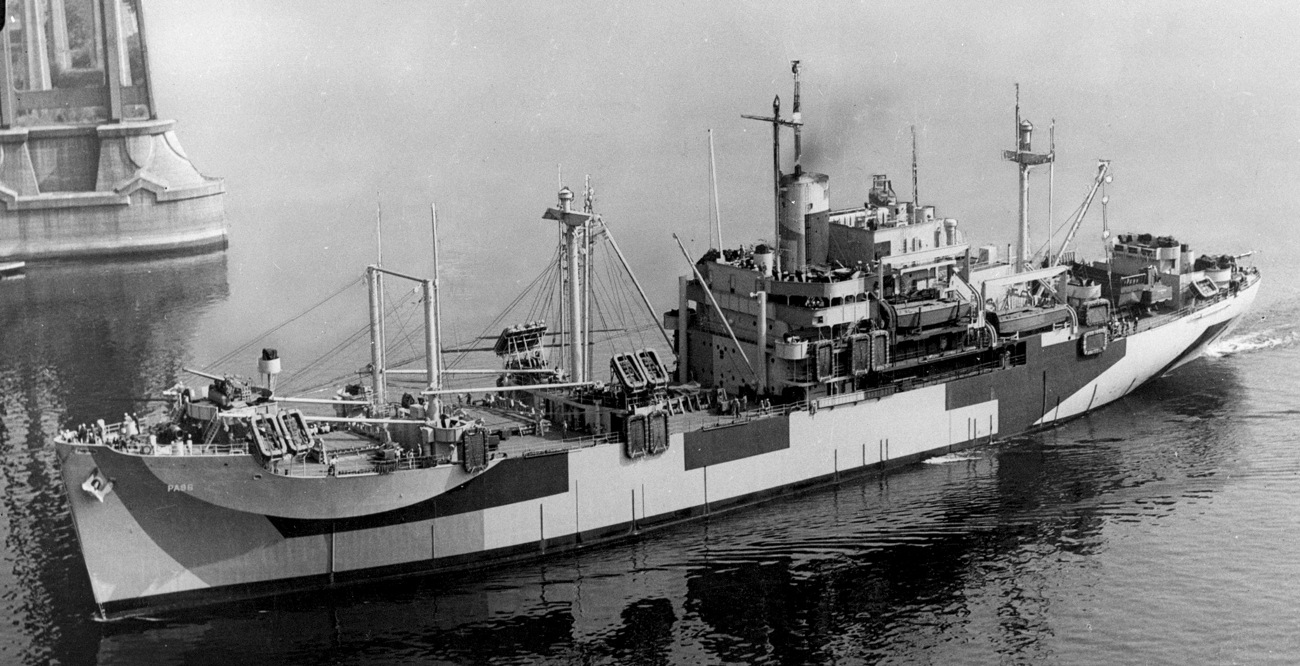

History

United States
- Name: USS Cecil
- Namesake: Cecil County, Maryland
- Builder: Western Pipe & Steel
- Laid down: 24 June 1943
- Launched: 27 September 1943
- Christened: Sea Angler
- Commissioned: 15 September 1944
- Decommissioned: 24 May 1946
- Renamed: USS Cecil, Steel Admiral.
- Honours and awards: Two battle stars for service in World War II.
- Fate: Scrapped October 1973
- Notes: WPS Hull No. 121.; MC Hull No. 1544.; Type C3-S-A2.; Sponsor: Mrs S. Belither. Delivered 28 February 1944.

General characteristics
- Class & type: Bayfield-class attack transport
- Displacement: 8,100 tons, 16,100 tons fully loaded
- Length: 492 ft (150 m)
- Beam: 69 ft 6 in (21.18 m)
- Draught: 26 ft 6 in (8.08 m)
- Propulsion: General Electric geared turbine, 2 x Babcock & Wilcox D-type boilers, single propeller, designed shaft horsepower 8,500
- Speed: 18 knots
- Boats & landing craft carried: 12 x LCVP, 4 x LCM (Mk-6), 3 x LCP(L) (MK-IV)
- Capacity: 4,800 tons (180,500 cu. ft).
- Complement: Crew: 51 officers, 524 enlisted; Flag: 43 officers, 108 enlisted.; Troops: 80 officers, 1,146 enlisted
- Armament: 2 × single 5 inch/38 cal. dual purpose gun mounts, one fore and one aft.; 2 × twin 40mm AA gun mounts forward, port and starboard.; 2 × single 40 mm AA gun mounts.; 18 × single 20mm AA gun mounts.

USS Cecil (APA-96) was a Bayfield class attack transport that served with the United States Navy from 1944 to 1946. She was sold into commercial service in 1947 and was scrapped in 1973.

== History ==
Launched as Sea Angler by Western Pipe & Steel, San Francisco, California, under a Maritime Commission contract, the vessel was acquired by the Navy 26 February 1944 and renamed Cecil after a county in Maryland. She was placed in reduced commission 27 February, converted at Commercial Iron Works, Portland, Oregon, and placed in full commission 15 September 1944.

=== Iwo Jima ===
Cecil cleared San Francisco 26 November 1944 for amphibious training in the Hawaiian Islands, and preparations for the invasion of Iwo Jima at Eniwetok and Saipan. She cleared Saipan with her task group 16 February, and 3 days later, took position off Iwo Jima for the initial assault. As naval and air bombardment pounded the island, her men skillfully played their part. Remaining off the hard-fought beaches, Cecil completed unloading troops, cargo, and vehicles, and embarked casualties, with whom she sailed 28 February to Saipan.

=== Okinawa ===
Cecil continued on to Tulagi and Espiritu Santo, where she loaded men and cargo of the 27th Infantry Division. On 9 April 1945, she landed these reinforcements through high surf on Okinawa. She remained for a week continuing her unloading under enemy air attacks, aiding in fighting them off as she loaded and landed her boats. On 16 April she got underway for Saipan and Ulithi, where she received minor repairs and replenished.

=== After hostilities ===
On 21 May, Cecil arrived in Subic Bay, P.I., for transport and training duty until 27 August, when she departed Luzon with troops and cargo of the 1st Cavalry Division, bound for occupation duty in Japan.

Cecil called at Yokohama from 2 to 4 September 1945, then returned to the Philippines to load more occupation troops. On the return passage to Japan, she was ordered into Okinawa from 25 September to 3 October to avoid a threatening typhoon, then proceeded on to disembark her troops at Aki Nada.

=== Operation Magic Carpet ===
She sailed to San Pedro, Los Angeles, for a minor overhaul in November, then made another voyage to the Philippines as part of Operation Magic Carpet, to return men and equipment to San Pedro, where she arrived on 22 January 1946.

=== Decommissioning and fate ===
In March, she sailed to Norfolk, Virginia, where she was decommissioned on 24 May 1946, and returned to the Maritime Commission the next day. In 1947 Cecil was purchased by the Isthmian Steamship Company which registered her in New York as Steel Admiral. Steel Admiral remained in service with Isthmian Steamship until 1973, when she was taken to Kaohsiung, Taiwan and scrapped in October of the same year.

== Awards ==
Cecil received two battle stars for World War II service.
