= USS Roberts (DE-749) =

Cannon-class destroyer escort

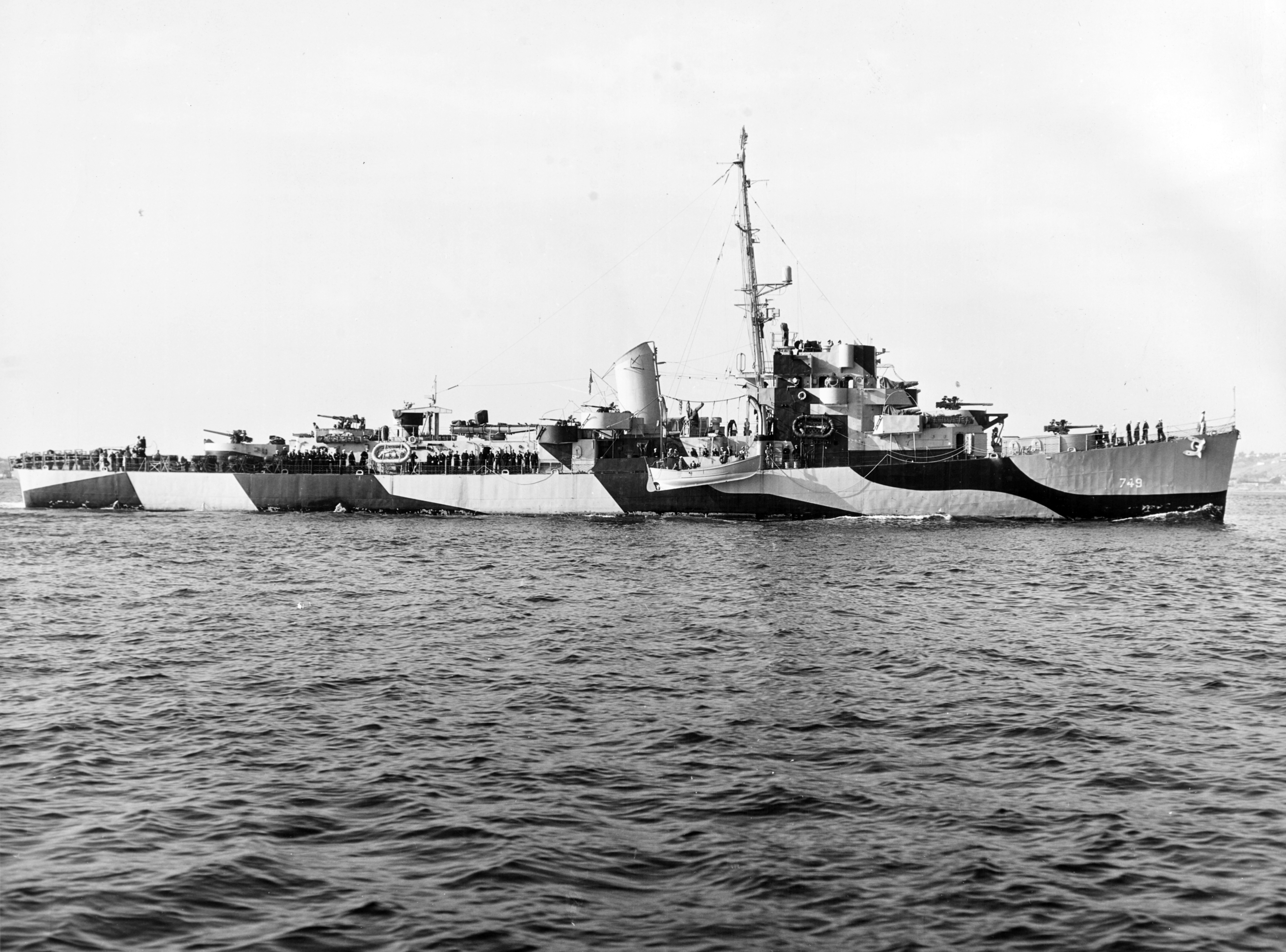

History

United States
- Name: USS Roberts
- Namesake: Arthur John Roberts, Jr.
- Builder: Western Pipe and Steel Company, Los Angeles, California
- Laid down: 7 July 1943
- Launched: 14 November 1943
- Commissioned: 2 September 1944
- Decommissioned: 21 September 1968
- Stricken: 23 September 1968
- Honors and awards: 1 battle star (World War II)
- Fate: Sunk as target, November 1971

General characteristics
- Class & type: Cannon-class destroyer escort
- Displacement: 1,240 long tons (1,260 t) standard; 1,620 long tons (1,646 t) full
- Length: 306 ft (93 m) o/a; 300 ft (91 m) w/l
- Beam: 36 ft 10 in (11.23 m)
- Draft: 11 ft 8 in (3.56 m)
- Propulsion: 4 × GM Mod. 16-278A diesel engines with electric drive, 6,000 shp (4,474 kW), 2 screws
- Speed: 21 knots (39 km/h; 24 mph)
- Range: 10,800 nmi (20,000 km) at 12 kn (22 km/h; 14 mph)
- Complement: 15 officers and 201 enlisted
- Armament: 3 × single Mk.22 3"/50 caliber guns; 1 × twin 40 mm Mk.1 AA gun; 8 × 20 mm Mk.4 AA guns; 3 × 21-inch (533 mm) torpedo tubes; 1 × Hedgehog Mk.10 anti-submarine mortar (144 rounds); 8 × Mk.6 depth charge projectors; 2 × Mk.9 depth charge tracks

USS Roberts (DE-749) was a Cannon-class destroyer escort in service with the United States Navy from 1943 to 1968. She was later sunk as a target in 1971.

== History ==
The ship was named in honor of Arthur John Roberts, Jr. who was killed in the Battle of Tassafaronga, Guadalcanal, 30 November-1 December 1942. The ship was laid down on 11 February 1943 by the Western Pipe and Steel Company, San Pedro, Los Angeles; launched on 14 November 1943; sponsored by Mrs. Ruth Marohn; and commissioned on 2 September 1944.

=== Pacific War ===
Following shakedown off southern California, Roberts sailed for Pearl Harbor on 30 November. On her arrival on 10 December, she joined a hunter-killer (HUK) group operating with Corregidor (CVE-58); and, for the next three weeks, patrolled to the north and east of Hawaii. During January and early February 1945, her group operated to the west, primarily in the Marshalls, then returned to Pearl Harbor. From 1 to 18 March, the group searched, unsuccessfully, between Johnston Island and Kwajalein for an overdue Army Air Corps transport carrying Lt. Gen. M. F. Harmon, USA. Toward the end of the month the ships replenished at Majuro, then resumed HUK operations, this time in the Marshalls.

Detached at the end of April, Roberts proceeded to Ulithi, whence she departed on 12 May for Okinawa. Screening Nehenta Bay (CVE-74) en route, she arrived at mid-month. On the 16th she joined Natoma Bay (CVE-62) and screened her until the 31st. On the 31st she escorted Gilbert Islands (CVE-107), then, on 1 June, departed the Ryūkyūs to escort Makin Island (CVE-93) to Guam.

Roberts arrived at Guam on the 5th, steamed to Eniwetok, and, on the 27th, resumed HUK operations with Kasaan Bay (CVE-69). Into July the group patrolled the shipping lanes of Micronesia, then, toward the end of the month, shifted to the Philippine Sea.

In early August Roberts returned to Guam for repairs. On the 15th, hostilities ceased and Roberts was assigned to duty in the western Pacific.

During September, she escorted landing craft of the U.S. 5th Fleet's amphibious force from Saipan to Nagasaki; then, in October, screened transports from Luzon to Sasebo. On 18 October, she departed Japan for the United States.

=== Training ship ===
The destroyer escort arrived at San Diego, California, on 10 November, then continued on to the Atlantic coast for pre-inactivation overhaul. In January 1946 she moved from Norfolk, Virginia, to Green Cove Springs, Florida, where she joined other ships waiting to berth with the "mothball fleet." In January 1947, however, she was ordered to the 5th Naval District for reserve training duty.

On 2 March Roberts arrived at Norfolk and on the 3rd, she was decommissioned and placed "in service, in reserve". For the remainder of the decade she served in that capacity and conducted reserve training cruises along the Atlantic coast and in the Caribbean.

In June 1950, war broke out in Korea. On 13 August, Roberts was recommissioned, in reserve, and 1 December she was placed in commission, active. Continuing her training duties, she expanded her operations, including fleet maneuvers on a large scale, in her cruises. In June 1952 she extended her training cruises to the Mediterranean, and, in 1953, she participated in NATO exercises. In the summer of 1954, an extended cruise took her to South American ports, while her two-week cruises ranged from Nova Scotia to Florida, and in the Caribbean.

Until October 1961, Roberts continued her reserve training duty. Then, with the Berlin Crisis, the Selected Reserve was called to active duty and Roberts was assigned to the newly formed escort squadron CortRon 12, based at Norfolk. On 1 August 1962, after the release of her reserve crew, she returned to Reserve Destroyer Squadron 34 and resumed Naval Reserve training.

=== Decommissioning and fate ===
Decommissioned and placed in service once again on 1 October 1964, Roberts continued her reserve training work, limiting her cruises to weekends and two weeks, until she was placed out of service on 21 September 1968. Her name was struck from the Navy List two days later. She was finally sunk as a target in November 1971.

== Awards ==
Roberts earned one battle star during World War II.
