= USS Lavaca =

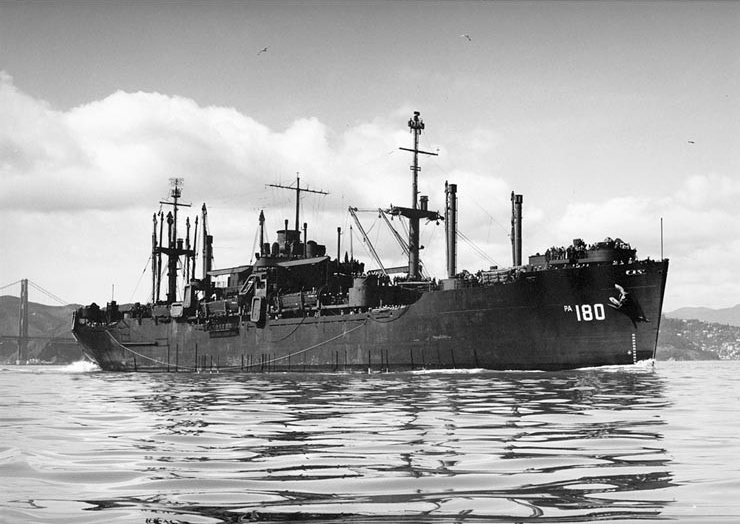
- USS Lavaca (APA-180)

History

United States
- Name: USS Lavaca
- Namesake: Lavaca County, Texas
- Builder: Oregon Shipbuilding
- Launched: 24 November 1944
- Commissioned: 17 December 1944
- Decommissioned: 31 January 1947
- Fate: Scrapped 1992

General characteristics
- Displacement: 6,873 tons
- Length: 455 feet (139 m)
- Beam: 62 feet (19 m)
- Draft: 24 feet (7.3 m)
- Propulsion: Oil Fired Steam Turbine; 1 Shaft
- Speed: 17 knots
- Boats & landing craft carried: 26
- Complement: 56 Officers, 480 Enlisted
- Armament: 1 5"/38 gun; 1 40 mm quad mount; 4 40 mm twin mounts; 10 20 mm single mounts

USS Lavaca (APA-180) was a Haskell-class attack transport built and used by the US Navy in World War II. She was a Victory ship design, VC2-S-AP5. She was named after Lavaca County, Texas, USA.

== World War II service ==
Lavaca was launched 27 November 1944 by the Oregon Shipbuilding Corp., Portland, Oregon, under a United States Maritime Commission contract; sponsored by Mrs. Charles Harper Jr.; acquired by the Navy 17 December 1944 and commissioned the same day.

After shakedown off California, Lavaca arrived San Diego 30 December and on 29 January 1945 became the flagship for Commander, Transport Division 65.

Lavaca arrived Pearl Harbor 25 February. Leaving 8 March, she transported Seabees to the Philippines, arriving Samar 27 March. From 27 March to 2 August Lavaca shuttled troops and equipment between the Admiralty and Philippine Islands.

On 2 August she arrived Markham Bay, New Guinea. That night an Australian plane crashed into Huon Gulf. Lavaca's salvage crew rescued five men and towed the plane to shore.

On 27 August following Japan's capitulation, Lavaca joined TF 33.1 at Luzon, prepared for the occupation of Japan, and arrived Yokohama 2 September. The attack transport shuttled passengers from Pearl Harbor and San Francisco to Sasebo, Japan, 7 September 1945 to 6 July 1946. In October 1946, she carried passengers from Shanghai, China to San Francisco.

She departed Sasebo for the east coast via Colón, Panama, and arrived Norfolk, Virginia, 12 July. Lavaca decommissioned 31 January 1947 and entered the Atlantic Reserve Fleet at Norfolk.

== Fate ==
She was struck from the Navy List 1 October 1958 following transfer to the Maritime Administration and placed in National Defense Reserve Fleet at Wilmington, North Carolina, in September. In October 1964 Lavaca was moved to the James River, Virginia. In late 1982 she was defueled. In 1986, and again in 1990, she was withdrawn from James River for stripping. Ex-Lavaca was sold for $125,244 to Global Marketing Systems, Inc. for scrapping on 14 October 1992. At 1030 EST, on 17 November 1992 she was withdrawn from the Reserve Fleet and sent to the breaker's yard.
