= USS Pavlic =

United States destroyer escort ship

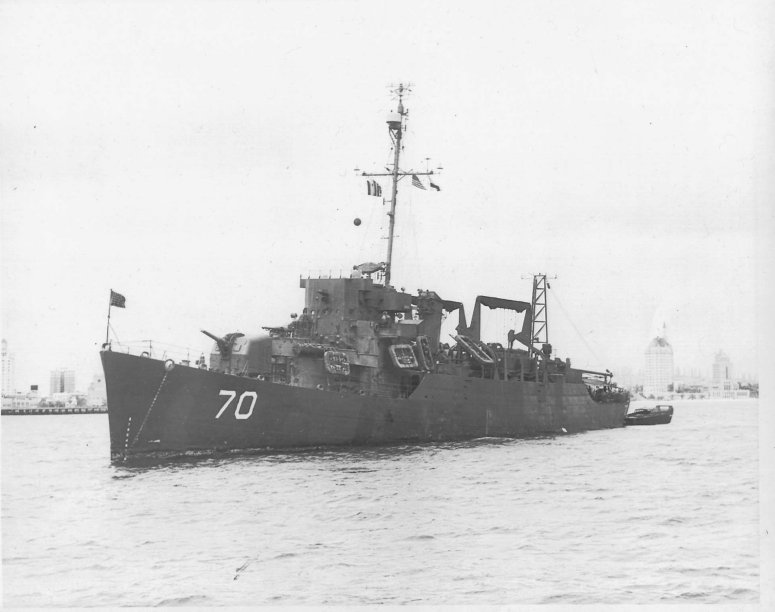
- USS Pavlic in San Diego Bay, California, in mid-1946.

History

United States
- Name: USS Pavlic
- Namesake: Lieutenant Commander Milton F. Pavlic (1909-1942), U.S. Navy Purple Heart recipient
- Builder: Dravo Corporation, Pittsburgh, Pennsylvania; Consolidated Steel Corporation, Orange, Texas
- Laid down: 21 September 1943
- Launched: 18 December 1943
- Sponsored by: Mrs. Milton F. Pavlic
- Commissioned: 29 December 1944
- Decommissioned: 15 November 1946
- Reclassified: From destroyer escort (DE-669) to high-speed transport (APD-70) 27 June 1944
- Stricken: 1 April 1967
- Honors and awards: One battle star for World War II service
- Fate: Sold for scrapping 1 July 1968
- Notes: Laid down as Buckley-class destroyer escort USS Pavlic (DE-669)

General characteristics
- Class & type: Charles Lawrence-class high-speed transport
- Displacement: 1,400 long tons (1,422 t)
- Length: 306 ft (93 m) overall
- Beam: 36 ft 10 in (11.23 m)
- Draft: 13 ft 6 in (4.11 m) maximum
- Installed power: 12,000 shaft horsepower (16 megawatts)
- Propulsion: Two boilers; two GE steam turbines (turbo-electric transmission)
- Speed: 24 knots (44 km/h; 28 mph)
- Range: 6,000 nautical miles (11,000 km) at 12 knots (22 km/h; 14 mph)
- Troops: 162
- Complement: 186
- Armament: 1 × 5 in (130 mm) gun; 6 × 40 mm guns; 6 × 20 mm guns; 2 × depth charge tracks

USS Pavlic (APD-70) was built by Dravo Corporation at Pittsburgh, Pennsylvania as a Buckley-class destroyer escort. Pavlic was launched 18 December 1943 and towed to Texas for refitting as a United States Navy high-speed transport. Pavlic was in commission from 1944 to 1946, serving in the Okinawa campaign as a radar picket ship. Pavlic was decommissioned 15 November 1946. After more than 20 years of inactivity in reserve, she was stricken from the Navy List on 1 April 1967. On 1 July 1968, she was sold for scrapping to North American Smelting Company.

Pavlic was named for Milton Frank Pavlic, a naval officer killed aboard the battleship USS South Dakota during the Naval Battle of Guadalcanal on 15 November 1942.

== Construction and commissioning ==
USS Pavlic (DE-669) was laid down as a Buckley-class destroyer escort on 21 September 1943 by the Dravo Corporation at Pittsburgh, Pennsylvania. USS Pavlic was launched 18 December 1943, sponsored by Mrs. Milton F. Pavlic. After launching, USS Pavlic was towed to Orange, Texas, for fitting out at the Consolidated Steel Corporation shipyard. After a six-month-long conversion, USS Pavlic was reclassified as a Charles Lawrence-class and was renamed USS Pavlic APD-70 on 27 June 1944. After her conversion, she was re-commissioned at Orange, Texas on 29 December 1944.

== Service history ==
=== World War II ===
After her shakedown cruise off Bermuda and amphibious warfare training at Portsmouth, Virginia, USS Pavlic departed Norfolk, Virginia, on 22 February 1945 for World War II service against the Japanese in the Pacific. She steamed via the Panama Canal to San Diego, California, before moving on to Pearl Harbor, Territory of Hawaii, where she arrived on 21 March 1945. Following training exercises in Hawaii, she departed Pearl Harbor on 13 April 1945 and steamed to Majuro Atoll in the Marshall Islands. She then stopped at Ulithi Atoll in the Caroline Islands before arriving in the Ryukyu Islands to participate in the Okinawa campaign

From 3 to 9 May 1945, Pavlic was stationed on the picket line off Okinawa, fighting off several Japanese air raids and performing rescue work. On 5 May 1945 her crew picked up the remains of USS LSM(R)-195 crew man, George J.Ruhlman, after his ship was sunk by a Kamikaze attack off Okinawa on 4 May 1945.

On 10 May 1945, she escorted the hospital ship USS Relief (AH-1) to Guam, then returned to Hagushi Anchorage off Okinawa on 12 May 1945 to resume patrol work.

On 18 May 1945, Pavlic was designated as a "special rescue vessel" and continued her rescue work while undergoing several heavy Japanese air raids.

On 27 May 1945, Pavlic repelled her first direct Japanese kamikaze suicide attack. On 28 May 1945, she opened fire on a low-flying Japanese Mitsubishi G4M "Betty" bomber which was operating as a torpedo bomber, causing it to veer away. Pavlic and her sister ship, the high-speed transport USS Yokes (APD-69), picked up survivors from the destroyer USS Drexler (DD-741), which had been sunk by two kamikaze attacks. Once the survivors were aboard, Pavlic sailed for Hagushi Anchorage for medical exam and wound dressing. On 29 May 1945 she picked up survivors from destroyer USS Shubrick (DD-639), which also had been damaged by a suicide plane.

For the remainder of World War II Pavlic continued to serve in the Pacific war zone, primarily in the Ryukyu Islands.

On 14 August 1945, Pavlic got underway, joining the United States Third Fleet off Tokyo, Japan. World War II ended with the surrender of Japan on 15 August 1945.

=== Postwar ===
On 18 August 1945, Pavlic made rendezvous with the British Pacific Fleet and took on board a Royal Navy and Royal Marine amphibious landing force from the British light cruiser HMS Newfoundland and the Royal New Zealand Navy light cruiser HMNZS Gambia. On 27 August 1945 she arrived at Honshu, Japan, entering Sagami Bay in the shadow of Mount Fuji, and on 30 August 1945 she steamed into Tokyo Bay with high-speed transports USS Sims (APD-50) and USS Barr (APD-39), and debarked landing forces to demilitarize and raise the colors over Fort Number 2 and Fort Number 4, guarding the entrance to Tokyo Bay. The landing forces returned, and Pavlic proceeded to Yokosuka Ko.

On 31 August 1945, with L Company of the United States Marine Corps's 4th Marine Regiment embarked, Pavlic made the short run to Tateyama Bay to secure the large Japanese naval air station there and remained there until 3 September 1945 supporting the Marines. On 3 September, after a United States Army occupation regiment relieved them, she reembarked the Marines and returned to Yokosuka Ko. On 9 September 1945, Pavlic was designated as a barracks ship.

On 15 April 1946, Pavlic departed Japan for the United States and, after a stop at San Diego and overhaul at the Philadelphia Naval Shipyard at Philadelphia, Pennsylvania, and the Charleston Naval Shipyard at Charleston, South Carolina, was towed to Green Cove Springs, Florida, for inactivation.

== Decommissioning and disposal ==
USS Pavlic was decommissioned at Green Cove Springs on 15 November 1946, and placed in the Florida Group of the Atlantic Reserve Fleet on the St. Johns River. After more than 20 years of inactivity in reserve, she was stricken from the Navy List on 1 April 1967. Three months later, on 1 July 1968, she was sold to North American Smelting Company as scrap.

== Honors and awards ==
Pavlic received one battle star for her World War II service in the Okinawa campaign.
