= USS LST-717 =

LST-542-class landing ship tank

History

United States
- Name: LST-717
- Builder: Jeffersonville Boat and Machine Co., Jeffersonville
- Laid down: 20 June 1944
- Launched: 29 July 1944
- Sponsored by: Mrs. Lou Anne Malsie
- Commissioned: 23 August 1944
- Decommissioned: 12 June 1946
- Stricken: 12 March 1948
- Identification: Callsign: NFTE
- Fate: Transferred to the Republic of China, 1946

Taiwan
- Name: Chung Yeh; (中業)
- Acquired: 12 June 1946
- Commissioned: 12 June 1946
- Fate: Transferred to China, 1953

China
- Acquired: 1953

General characteristics
- Class & type: LST-542-class tank landing ship
- Displacement: 1,625 long tons (1,651 t) light; 4,080 long tons (4,145 t) full
- Length: 328 ft (100 m)
- Beam: 50 ft (15 m)
- Draft: Unloaded : 2 ft 4 in (0.71 m) forward; 7 ft 6 in (2.29 m) aft; Loaded : 8 ft 2 in (2.49 m) forward; 14 ft 1 in (4.29 m) aft
- Propulsion: 2 × General Motors 12-567 diesel engines, two shafts, twin rudders
- Speed: 12 knots (22 km/h; 14 mph)
- Boats & landing craft carried: 2 × LCVPs
- Troops: 16 officers, 147 enlisted men
- Complement: 7 officers, 104 enlisted men
- Armament: 8 × 40 mm guns; 12 × 20 mm guns

USS LST-717 was a LST-542-class tank landing ship in the United States Navy during World War II. She was transferred to the Republic of China Navy as ROCS Chung Yeh.

== Construction and commissioning ==
LST-717 was laid down on 20 June 1944 at Jeffersonville Boat and Machine Company, Jeffersonville, Indiana. Launched on 29 July 1944 and commissioned on 23 August 1944.

=== Service in United States Navy ===
During World War II, LST-717 was assigned to the Asiatic-Pacific theater. She then participated in the Palawan Island landings from 1 to 7 March 1945 and Mindanao Island landings from 17 to 23 April 1945. She was assigned to occupation and China from 2 September 1945 to 12 June 1946.

She was decommissioned on 12 June 1946 and was struck from the Naval Register on 12 March 1946. On 12 June 1946, she was then transferred to the Republic of China under the lend-lease program and renamed Chung Yeh.

=== Service in Republic of China Navy ===
On 13 November 1947, she was stranded on the Changshan Island.

She was then incorporated into People's Liberation Army Navy in 1953 after her repair.

== Awards ==
LST-717 have earned the following awards:

- American Campaign Medal
- Asiatic-Pacific Campaign Medal (1 battle star)
- World War II Victory Medal
- Navy Occupation Service Medal (with Asia clasp)
- Philippine Presidential Unit Citation
- Philippine Liberation Medal (1 battle star)

== Sources ==
- United States. Dept. of the Treasury (1962). Treasury Decisions Under the Customs, Internal Revenue, Industrial Alcohol, Narcotic and Other Laws, Volume 97. U.S. Government Printing Office.
- Moore, Capt. John (1984). Jane's Fighting Ships 1984-85. Jane's Information Group. ISBN 978-0710607959.
- Saunders, Stephen (2009). Jane's Fighting Ships 2009-2010. Jane's Information Group. ISBN 978-0710628886.
- Fairplay International Shipping Journal Volume 222. United Kingdom: Fairplay Publishing Limited. 1967.
