= 212 Medea =

Main-belt asteroid

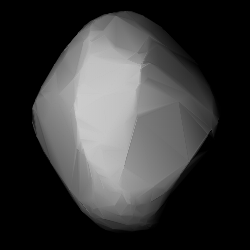
- 3D convex shape model of 212 Medea

Discovery
- Discovered by: Johann Palisa
- Discovery date: 6 February 1880

Designations
- Pronunciation: /mɪˈdiːə/
- Named after: Medea
- Alternative designations: A880 CA, 1930 FW
- Minor planet category: Main belt

Orbital characteristics
- Epoch 31 July 2016 (JD 2457600.5)
- Uncertainty parameter 0
- Observation arc: 136.05 yr (49694 d)
- Aphelion: 3.4422 AU (514.95 Gm)
- Perihelion: 2.78929 AU (417.272 Gm)
- Semi-major axis: 3.11575 AU (466.110 Gm)
- Eccentricity: 0.10478
- Orbital period (sidereal): 5.50 yr (2008.8 d)
- Mean anomaly: 28.1280°
- Mean motion: 0° 10^{m} 45.156^{s} / day
- Inclination: 4.2636°
- Longitude of ascending node: 313.478°
- Argument of perihelion: 100.91°

Physical characteristics
- Mean diameter: 136.12±2.5 km 144.13 ± 7.23 km (composite estimate)
- Mass: (1.29±0.24)×10^{18} kg (Note: Calculated from its standard gravitational parameter GM = 0.086±0.016 km^{3}/s^{2}.)
- Mean density: 0.97 g/cm^{3} (Note: Assuming a diameter of 136 km.)
- Synodic rotation period: 10.283 h (0.4285 d); 10.12 h
- Geometric albedo: 0.0465±0.002
- Spectral type: DCX:
- Absolute magnitude (H): 8.28

212 Medea is a main-belt asteroid that was discovered by Johann Palisa on February 6, 1880, in Pola, and was named after Medea, a figure in Greek mythology.

Photometric observations of this asteroid in 1987 gave an incomplete lightcurve with a period of 10.12 ± 0.06 hours and a brightness variation of 0.13 in magnitude. This object has a spectrum that matches a DCX: classification. Lightcurve data has also been recorded by observers at the Antelope Hill Observatory (H09), which has been designated as an official observatory by the Minor Planet Center. They found a period of 10.283 hours with a brightness variation of 0.08 magnitude.
