= USS Genesee (AOG-8) =

Patapsco-class gasoline tanker

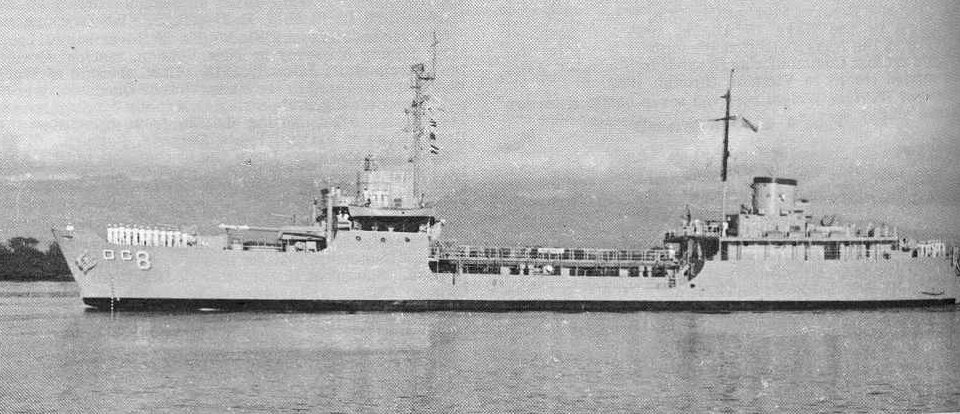

History

United States
- Name: USS Genesee (AOG-8)
- Launched: 23 September 1943
- Commissioned: 28 May 1944
- Decommissioned: 14 December 1949
- In service: 28 July 1950
- Stricken: 25 June 1972
- Fate: transferred to Chile, 25 June 1972

History

Chile
- Name: Beagle (AOG-54)
- Namesake: Beagle Channel
- Acquired: 25 June 1972
- Commissioned: 5 July 1972
- Decommissioned: 7 April 1982
- Stricken: 16 January 1992
- Fate: Sunk in Live fire exercise

General characteristics
- Tonnage: 2,210 long tons deadweight (DWT)
- Displacement: 1,850 tons(lt) 4,130 tons(fl)
- Length: 310 ft 9 in (94.72 m)
- Beam: 48 ft 6 in (14.78 m)
- Draft: 15 ft 8 in (4.78 m)
- Propulsion: four GE diesel electric engines, twin shafts, 3,300 hp
- Speed: 15.5 knots (29 km/h).
- Complement: 131
- Armament: four 3 in (76 mm) dual purpose guns, twelve 20 mm guns

USS Genesee (AOG-8) was a Patapsco-class gasoline tanker acquired by the U.S. Navy for the dangerous task of transporting gasoline to warships in the fleet, and to remote Navy stations.

Genesee had the distinction of serving in World War II, the Korean War, and the Vietnam War, and returned home with battle and campaign stars to her credit.

The third ship to be named Genesee by the Navy, AOG-8 was launched on 23 September 1943 by Cargill, Inc., Savage, Minnesota, sponsored by Mrs. Helen Rae Clark and commissioned on 27 May 1944.

== World War II service ==
After shakedown, Genesee loaded her first cargo of high octane aviation gasoline at Aruba, Netherlands West Indies, 14 July 1944 and entered Pearl Harbor 11 August. Until the spring of 1945, she made five voyages from Pearl Harbor to Canton Island and the Phoenix Islands, a vital refueling base for planes flying to the South Pacific Ocean, and numerous inter-island runs.

She reached Eniwetok on 5 March 1945 and, after loading a maximum cargo of diesel oil and freight, sailed for Ulithi and Leyte to discharge her oil. Following her return to Ulithi and a round-trip voyage thence to Hollandia, Genesee loaded motor gasoline at Ulithi and steamed to Okinawa, arriving 20 May 1945.

=== End-of-war activity ===
She served the fleet through the summer, getting underway 26 August with motor and aviation gasoline for Tokyo Bay. She moored to the Yokohama Oil Docks 2 September 1945, the day of Japan's formal surrender ceremony on board battleship Missouri (BB-63). One of the first Allied tankers to anchor in Japanese homeland waters since 1941, Genesee delivered oil and gasoline to different Japanese ports until departing 14 December 1945 for Long Beach, California, arriving on 19 January 1946.

== Post-war operations ==
Until the winter of 1949 Genesee operated in the Pacific, visiting such distant ports as Samoa; Guam; Jinsen, Korea; Yokosuka; Qingdao, China; Seattle, Washington, Kwajalein; and Kodiak, Alaska, while operating out of San Francisco, California, Pearl Harbor, Hawaii, and San Diego, California. She decommissioned at San Francisco 14 December, but the Korean War soon restored her to active duty.

== Reactivated during Korean War ==
Recommissioned 28 July 1950, Genesee put in at San Diego 25 August and subsequently reached Pearl Harbor 5 October. Following voyages thence to Midway Island, Eniwetok, and Samoa, she sailed for Japan 8 January 1952, arriving Sasebo 23 January, and made frequent fuel-carrying voyages to Korea supporting United Nations Command forces.

Genesee reached Guam 2 May and operated there until returning to Pearl Harbor 3 August 1952. Based at Pearl Harbor until the spring of 1960, Genesee cruised thence to Eniwetok, Guam, Subic Bay, Melbourne, Australia, Long Beach, California, and Yokosuka, Japan. She sailed 31 May 1960 for her new home port of Sasebo, Japan, arriving 17 June, and continued operations in Far Eastern waters. On 3 January 1961 she got underway for Subic Bay, where she stood by during the Laotian crisis until 25 January, and-returned to Sasebo when the danger of combat passed.

Her home port was changed to Subic Bay early in 1962 and, through June 1964, Genesee was occupied with demanding training exercises and cruises in the Philippine, Korean, Japanese, and Okinawan waters. She arrived Pearl Harbor, her new home port, 26 July 1964 and made a run to Midway in August to deliver jet fuel. She then headed for the U.S. West Coast in the fall for Operation Hardnose off the Camp Pendleton area. The gasoline tanker next made a run to Pearl Harbor with gasoline and diesel fuel, arriving 31 October. She began a much needed yard overhaul at Pearl Harbor 15 December which was completed in March 1965.

== Vietnam War operations ==
While Genesee was being overhauled, fighting in South Vietnam was intensified. Repairs completed, the tanker headed for the fighting zone where her outstanding service won her the Navy Unit Citation. She "contributed materially to the success of military operations by delivering over 9.8 million gallons of petroleum fuel, pumping over 2 million gallons of salt water to aid in air strip construction, delivering diesel fuel from her bunkers and maintaining bottom lay fuel lines on a most demanding schedule and frequently under most adverse weather conditions in an open sea anchorage."

Genesee returned to Pearl Harbor 16 November for upkeep and operations in Hawaiian waters. She sailed for the Far East once more 2 May 1966 and 3 June was again off Da Nang, South Vietnam, supporting the 3d Marine Amphibious Force. Late in October she left the war zone and steamed, via the Philippines and Japan to Pearl Harbor, where early in 1967 she prepared for future action.

Genesee returned to Vietnam in 1968 and 1969. She was hit by enemy fire while up the Cửa Việt river in 1968. One sailor was killed (SF3 Ball) and another injured (SN Perkins).

== Decommissioning and Chilean Navy Service ==
Genesee was decommissioned (date unknown) and struck from the Naval Register, 25 June 1972. She was transferred to Chile under terms of the Security Assistance Program, 25 June 1972, and renamed Beagle (AOG-54), serving mostly as an auxiliary submarine tender, based on the port of Valparaíso. Genesee was decommissioned by the Chilean Navy on 7 April 1982. After that served as an oiler hulk. Finally struck on 16 January 1992 and sunk in a Live fire exercise.

== Military awards and honors ==
Genesee was awarded one battle star for World War II service:

- Okinawa Gunto operation

Genesee was awarded one battle star for her services during the Korean War:

- Second Korean Winter Campaign

She received five campaign stars for her services during the Vietnam War:

- Vietnam Defense
- Vietnam Counteroffensive
- Vietnam Counteroffensive-Phase II
- Vietnam Counteroffensive-Phase IV
- Vietnam Counteroffensive-Phase IV

Genesee’s crew was eligible for the following medals, ribbons, and commendations:

- Combat Action Ribbon (28 April 1968)
- Navy Unit Commendation
- China Service Medal (extended)
- American Campaign Medal
- Asiatic-Pacific Campaign Medal (1)
- World War II Victory Medal
- Navy Occupation Service Medal (with Asia clasp)
- National Defense Service Medal (2)
- Korean Service Medal (1)
- Armed Forces Expeditionary Medal (2-Vietnam, 1 July 1958 – 3 July 1965)
- Vietnam Service Medal (5)
- Republic of Vietnam Gallantry Cross Unit Citation (6)
- United Nations Service Medal
- Republic of Vietnam Campaign Medal
- Republic of Korea War Service Medal (retroactive)

There was one personnel award:

- Purple Heart (1-KIA Arthur Ball SFM3, 22 April 1968)
- Navy and Marine Medal {Steven Friedman SK2, 1 May 1968}
