= USS PGM-32 =

U.S WWII gunboat

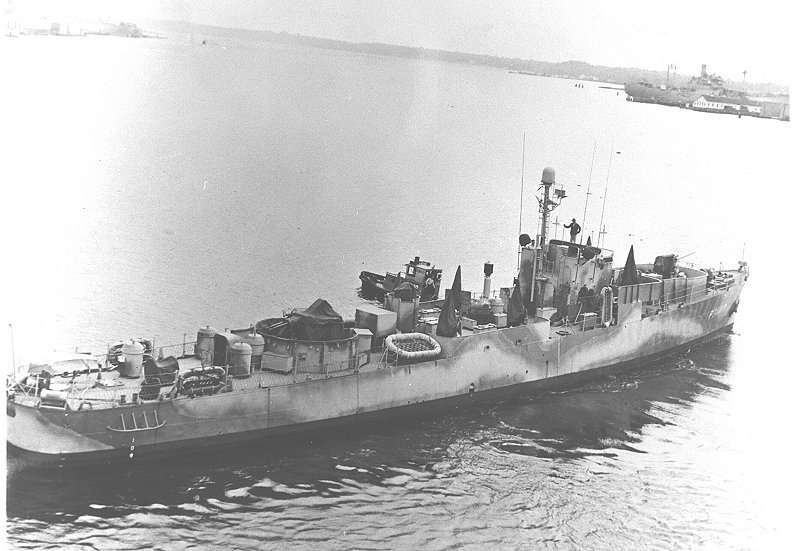
- Sister ship, PGM-17

History

United States
- Name: PGM-32
- Builder: Leathem D. Smith Shipbuilding Co.
- Laid down: 14 August 1944
- Launched: 14 October 1944
- Commissioned: 9 February 1945
- In service: 1945
- Out of service: 1947
- Identification: PGM-32
- Fate: Sold, October 1947

General characteristics
- Type: PGM-9 Class Motor Gunboat
- Displacement: 280 tons(light) 450 tons(full)
- Length: 173 feet, 8 inches
- Beam: 23 feet
- Draft: 10 feet, 10 inches
- Propulsion: Two 1,280bhp Hooven-Owen-Rentschler RB-99 DA diesel engines
- Speed: 19 knots
- Complement: 65 Officers and Enlisted
- Armament: 1 × 3"/50 dual purpose gun; 1 x twin 40 mm gun; 6 × 20 mm guns; 4 x twin .50 cal (12.7 mm) heavy machine guns

USS PGM-32 was a PGM-9-class motor gunboat in service with the United States Navy during the end of World War II, and briefly post-war.

== History ==
PGM-32 was laid down on 14 August 1944, as PC-1568 by the Leathem D. Smith Shipbuilding Co. Two days later on 16 August, she was reclassified as Motor Gunboat, and renamed PGM-32. On 14 October 1944, she was launched, and was commissioned on 9 February 1945.

On 2 September 1945, PGM-32 was present in Tokyo Bay for the Japanese surrender aboard the USS Missouri.

In 1946, she participated in Operation Crossroads, the U.S. nuclear testing at Bikini Atoll. PGM-32 would survive the blasts.

== Ship's fate ==
PGM-32 was transferred to the State Department, Foreign Liquidation Commission on 27 October 1947 and subsequently sold. Her fate is unknown.
