= USS Plumas County =

1945 LST-542-class tank landing ship

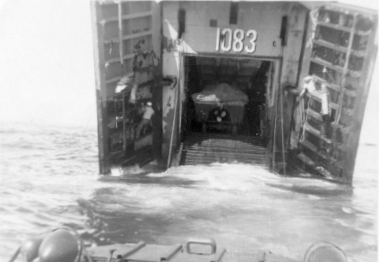
- USMC DUKW entering LST-1083 USS Plumas County during maneuvers near Oakland, California

History

United States
- Name: USS Plumas County (LST-1083)
- Namesake: Plumas County, California
- Builder: American Bridge Company, Ambridge, Pennsylvania
- Laid down: 22 November 1944
- Launched: 14 January 1945
- Commissioned: 13 February 1945
- Recommissioned: 8 September 1950
- Decommissioned: August 1946
- Reclassified: Reserve status from 22 August 1961; Transferred to MSTS in December 1965
- Honors and awards: One battle star for World War II; Four battle stars for the Korean War

General characteristics
- Class & type: LST-542-class LST
- Displacement: 1,490 tons (light); 4,080 tons (full load of 2,100 tons)
- Length: 328 ft (100 m)
- Beam: 50 ft (15 m)
- Draft: 8 ft (2.4 m) forward; 14 ft 4 in (4.37 m) aft (full load)
- Propulsion: Two diesel engines, two shafts
- Speed: 10.8 knots (20 km/h) (max); 9 knots (17 km/h) (econ)
- Complement: 7 officers, 204 enlisted
- Armament: 8 × 40 mm guns; 12 × 20 mm guns

USS Plumas County (LST-1083) was an LST-542-class tank landing ship in the United States Navy. Unlike many of her class, which received only numbers and were disposed of after World War II, she survived long enough to be named. On 1 July 1955, all LSTs still in commission were named for US counties or parishes; LST-1083 was given the name Plumas County, after Plumas County, California.

== History ==
She was built in Ambridge, Pennsylvania by the American Bridge Company, and was launched on 14 January 1945.

=== World War II ===
She passed through the Panama Canal and saw combat action at Midway, Wake Island, the Marshall Islands, Guam, Saipan, the Mariana Islands, Leyte in the Philippines, and Okinawa.

She was the first LST to drop anchor in Japanese waters after the atom bomb was dropped, and was present at the signing of the Japanese surrender.

=== Post-World War II ===
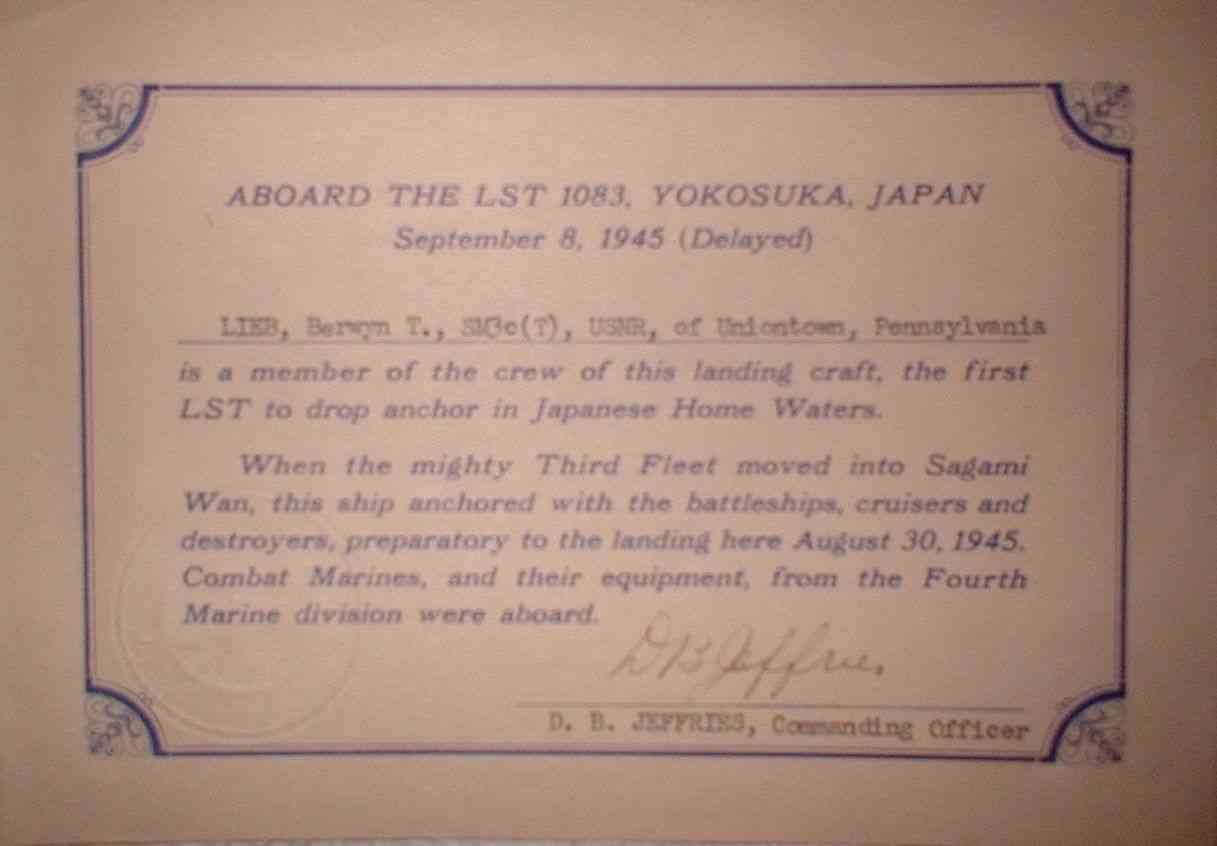
Certificate declaring LST-1083 as the first LST to anchor in Tokyo Bay.

She returned to San Francisco after the war, and was decommissioned in August 1946. She was recommissioned on 8 September 1950 and served in the Korean War, finally returning to California in July 1954.

She was named Plumas County on 1 July 1955 and spent the rest of her career operating off California, and in the Pacific, carrying out joint amphibious exercises with Nationalist China and South Korea. She was placed in reserve at Sasebo on 22 August 1961, and was transferred to the Military Sea Transportation Service in December 1965.

Plumas County earned one battle star during World War II and three battle stars during the Korean War.
