= USS Florikan =

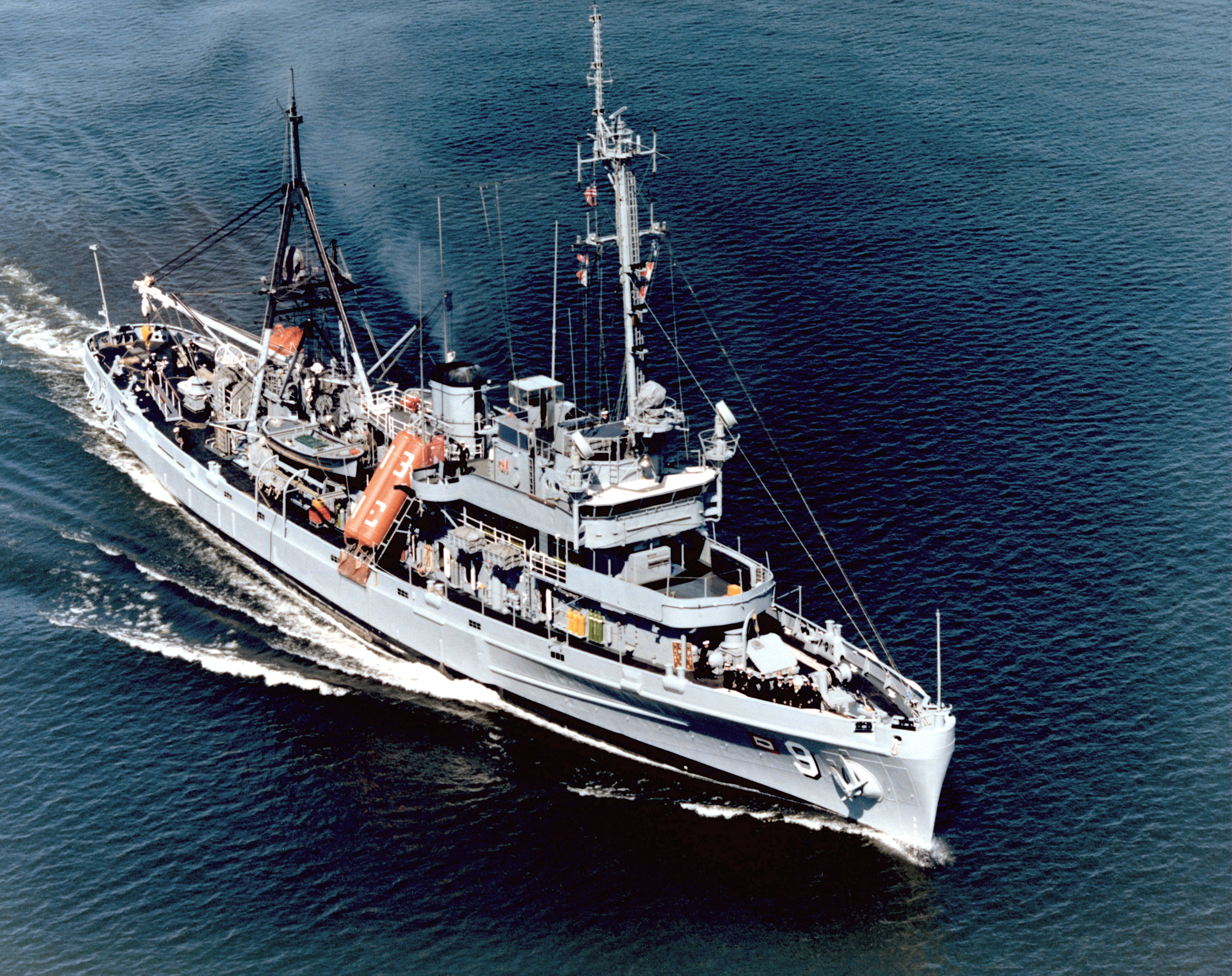
- USS Florikan (ASR-9) underway on 1 May 1982

History

United States
- Name: USS Florikan
- Ordered: 30 December 1940
- Builder: Moore Dry Dock Company
- Laid down: 30 September 1941
- Launched: 14 June 1942
- Commissioned: 5 April 1943
- Decommissioned: 2 August 1991
- Stricken: 3 September 1991
- Fate: Sold for Scrapping 2 July 2010 to Marine Metals, Brownsville, Tx

General characteristics
- Class & type: Chanticleer-class submarine rescue ship
- Displacement: 1,780 long tons (1,809 t)
- Length: 251 ft 4 in (76.61 m)
- Beam: 42 ft (13 m)
- Draft: 14 ft 3 in (4.34 m)
- Speed: 16 knots (18 mph; 30 km/h)
- Complement: 102 officers and enlisted
- Armament: 2 × 3"/50 caliber guns

USS Florikan (ASR-9) was a Chanticleer-class submarine rescue ship in the United States Navy.

== Construction and commissioning ==
Florikan was launched 14 June 1942 by Moore Dry Dock Company, Oakland, California; sponsored by Mrs. L. Sahm; and commissioned 5 April 1943.

== Service history ==
From 3 to 20 July 1943, Florikan aided in the training of submarines at Pearl Harbor, acting as target, screening, escort, and torpedo recovery vessel. She served on similar duty at Midway between 24 July and 2 September, then sailed for Kiska, Alaska, arriving 7 September. For a month, she carried out diving operations on Japanese submarine I-7, which had been grounded by her crew south of Kiska Harbor. Their attempts to scuttle the submarine had been incomplete, the after half remaining intact in a hundred feet of water. Seven divers entered the hulk, recovering important documents and personal papers of value in intelligence work.

Florikan returned to duty at Midway from 9 October 1943 to 12 November, then served at Pearl Harbor from 16 November to 11 June 1944. With Majuro activated as a forward base for submarines, Florikan trained submarines there from 18 June to 31 January 1945, then returned to duty at Pearl Harbor through the close of the war.

Assigned to home port at San Diego, Florikan first arrived there 12 September 1946, and through the next 15 years, trained submarine rescue personnel there, took part in fleet exercises and training operations, and brought her specialized services to the Far East in a tour of duty with the 7th Fleet each year save 1952, 1954, 1956, and 1958. On her 1960 deployment, she escorted a Vietnamese ship across the Pacific when outward bound.

She was decommissioned on 2 August 1991 and struck from the Naval Vessel Register on 3 September 1991 and remained at Inactive Ships, Pearl Harbor until 6 October 2000, when she entered the Suisun Bay Reserve Fleet. Her title was transferred from the Navy to MARAD on 28 July 2001. On 28 November 2006, she was cleaned for possible use as a SINKEX target, but instead MARAD issued a contract to dismantle Florikan on 2 July 2010 to Marine Metals of Brownsville, Tx for $895,708. Florikan completed her hull cleaning on 2 August 2010 at Bay Ship & Yacht, Alameda, Ca and she was completely dismantled on 29 December 2010, when she was withdrawn from the reserve fleet inventory.

== Awards ==
- Asiatic-Pacific Campaign Medal
- World War II Victory Medal
- National Defense Service Medal with 2 stars
