= USS Cree =

Tugboat of the United States Navy

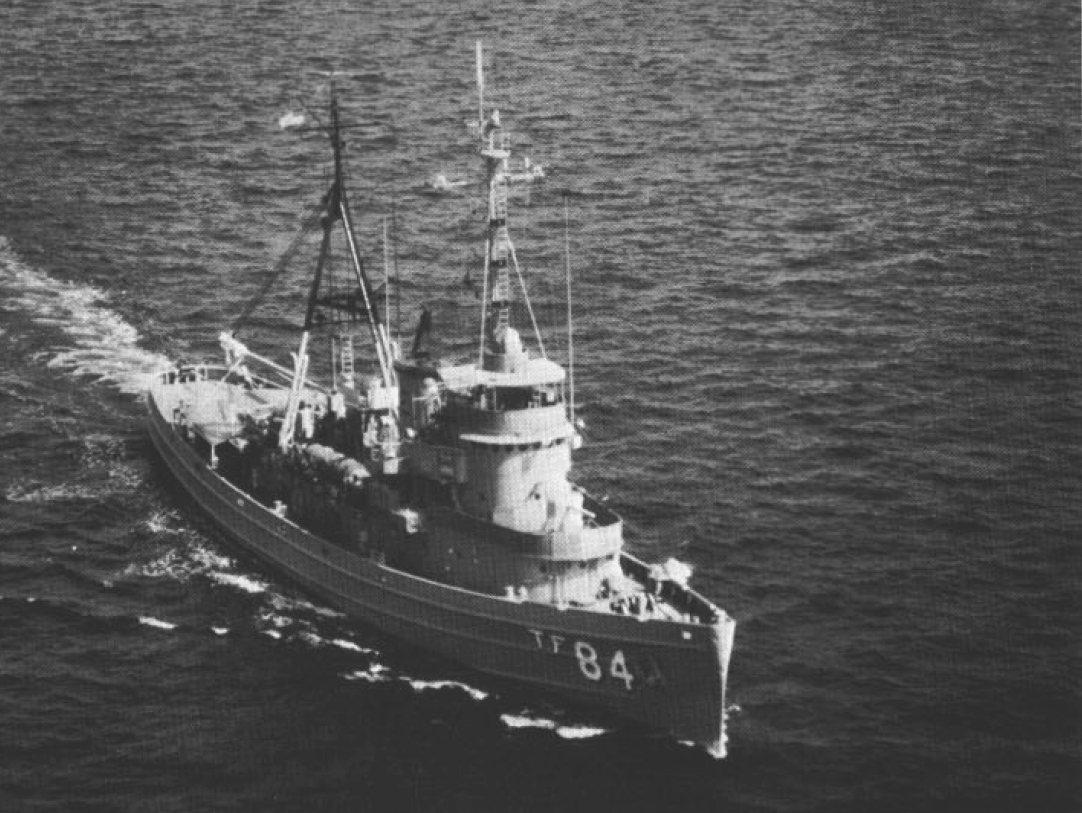

History

United States
- Name: USS Cree
- Namesake: Cree
- Builder: United Engineering Co., San Francisco, California
- Laid down: 31 March 1942
- Launched: 17 August 1942
- Commissioned: 28 March 1943
- Reclassified: ATF-84, 15 May 1944
- Stricken: 21 April 1978
- Motto: Ready
- Honours and awards: 2 battle stars (World War II); 4 battle stars (Korea)
- Fate: Sunk as a target, 27 August 1978

General characteristics
- Class & type: Cherokee-class fleet tug
- Displacement: 1,235 long tons (1,255 t) light; 1,675 long tons (1,702 t) full
- Length: 205 ft (62 m)
- Beam: 38 ft 6 in (11.73 m)
- Draft: 15 ft 4 in (4.67 m)
- Propulsion: Diesel-electric; 4 × General Motors 12-278A diesel engines driving 4 General Electric generators and 3 General Motors 3-268A auxiliary services engines; single screw; 3,600 shp (2,685 kW)
- Speed: 16.5 knots (30.6 km/h; 19.0 mph)
- Complement: 85 officers and enlisted
- Armament: 1 × single 3"/50 caliber gun; 2 × twin 40 mm AA guns; 2 × single 20 mm AA guns

USS Cree (AT/ATF-84), a Cherokee-class fleet tug, was a ship of the United States Navy named for the Cree, an indigenous people of North America whose people range from the Rocky Mountains to the Atlantic Ocean.

Cree was one of 70 such vessels produced in this World War II-era class. Military Sealift Command currently uses fleet ocean tugs from the Powhatan class to accomplish a similar mission today. Cree participated in several classified missions such as Operation Wigwam.

== Service history ==
Cree (AT-84) was launched 17 August 1942 by United Engineering Co., San Francisco, California; sponsored by Mrs. T. Colburn; and commissioned 28 March 1943.

=== World War II ===
From 10 April to 9 May 1943 Cree sailed between San Francisco and San Diego towing target sleds and dry-dock sections. She cleared on 11 May for Seattle and Dutch Harbor, and operated out of Adak from 26 July 1943 to 15 August 1944. Cree screened transports to Kiska, had towing and salvage duties, and aided the distressed Soviet ship Valery Chkalov between 15 December and 23 December 1943. Cree was reclassified ATF-84, 15 May 1944.

Returning to San Francisco on 21 August 1944, Cree sailed on 1 October to serve as retriever tug for a convoy to Eniwetok, returning to Pearl Harbor on`14 November. She cleared on 7 December on another convoy trip to Eniwetok, then continued to Guam and Ulithi on towing duty. She joined the screen of the replenishment group of the 5th Fleet at Ulithi on 8 February 1945 and sortied for the invasion of Iwo Jima, during which she stood by for salvage assignments, until returning to Ulithi to replenish on 5 March. Cree arrived off Okinawa on 16 March for salvage operations on the beachheads until 1 July, when she sailed for overhaul at San Pedro Bay, Leyte.

=== Korean War ===
Cree was based at Pearl Harbor for towing and salvage duties throughout the Pacific until the outbreak of the Korean War. Arriving at Yokosuka on 6 July 1950, she acted as beaching control off Kyuryuhon on 16 and 17 August, transferring salvage equipment to the Korean Navy, buoying swept channels, and supporting the Inchon landings from 15 September to 15 October with salvage and towing services. Returning to Long Beach, California, 16 June for overhaul, Cree operated alternately at Pearl Harbor and in the Pacific islands and along the west coast until 4 August 1959, when she sailed for duty based on Sasebo, Japan, until 19 December. She returned to west coast operations through September 1960 when she sailed for her 1960-61 Far Eastern tour of duty.

In May 1955 Cree participated in Operation Wigwam, an underwater atomic test off of the coast of California.

=== Vietnam ===
During the Vietnam War Cree was part of the "Tonkin Gulf Yacht Club" (the US 7th Fleet) with missions including (but not limited to) chasing trawlers and towing floating barracks across the Pacific.

=== "Friendly fire" incident ===
On the morning of 18 January 1978, Cree released the ex-YO-129 as a target for "live" bombing practice by naval aircraft, while steaming off the coast of southern California. Cree then proceeded north to clear the target area, taking her assigned station, but mistakenly became a target when a "Navy jet aircraft" made an attack run on her at 1206, unleashing three 500 lb bombs on the ship and her crew. One bomb struck the mast and exploded in the air close aboard to starboard, showering the tug with fragments. The second bomb fell along the port side, sliced beneath the ship and exploded underwater off the starboard side, "engulfing" Cree in a wall of water. The third slammed into the ship on the port bow, passing through seven bulkheads in the forward part of the ship, before becoming wedged into the passageway between the chief petty officer's quarters and sick bay, though failing to detonate. The damage to the ship was severe, including holing of the mast, destruction of two life rafts, severing of the emergency power cable and fragment damage above the 01 level. Below decks, the ship's gyro was destroyed by the bomb forward, which also damaged the diving locker and bulkheads. The underwater explosion, however, caused the most serious damage, blasting several holes in bulkheads and splitting seams. Motor room B-2 became "a tangled mass of warped frames," with equipment "wrenched from mountings and broken lines." Flooding in excess of 2,000 gallons per minute was reported.

Going to General Quarters, the crew responded immediately, but during their efforts to save the ship, discovered the live bomb where it wedged forward, just 20 feet (6 m) from where the repair party was stationed. Moving aft away from the 500-pounder, the repair party was temporarily relieved by an EOD team from Enterprise (CVN-65) rushed to Cree. Within 45 minutes the team was on board and able to defuse the bomb (first the EOD team called for a ship's electrician to tape up wires around the bomb. They were afraid that any current left in the wires might set the bomb off. Once the wires were taped they defused the bomb). Seven men of the repair party braved "rising water, leaking fuel and oil from broken lines," as well as the absence of light, entering Motor Room B-2 to battle the flooding for two hours before getting it under control.

Additional ships rendering assistance included USS Long Beach, guided missile destroyer USS John Paul Jones and tug USS Moctobi, providing portable pumps, gasoline and "other supplies." Guided missile frigate USS Brooke was also operating in the area on a training exercise and responded to the mayday call. As the other ships arrived before her, she stood by in case additional help was needed. Taken under tow that evening by John Paul Jones, which transferred her to Moctobi early the next afternoon, Cree returned to San Diego on the 19th, her exhausted crew having battled for 27 hours to keep their ship afloat.

The ship was struck from the Navy List on 21 April 1978, and finally sunk as a target on 27 August 1978.

== Gallery ==
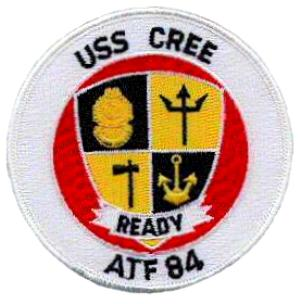
USS Cree Insignia

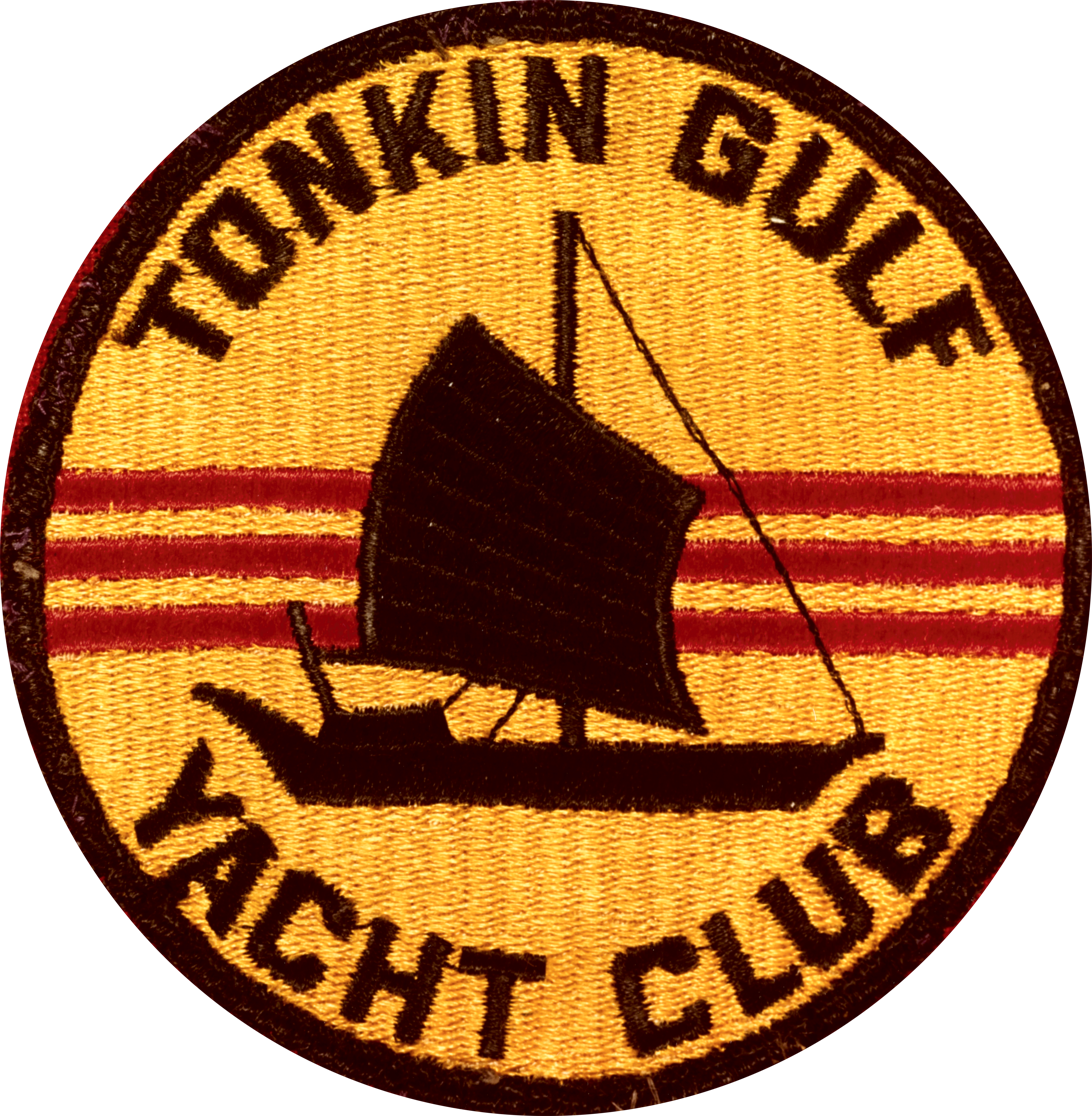
Tonkin Gulf Yacht Club Insignia

== Awards ==
- Two World War II battle stars
- Three Korean War battle stars
- American Campaign Medal
- Two Asiatic-Pacific Campaign Medals
- World War II Victory Medal
- Two National Defense Service Medals
- Three Korean Service Medals
- Armed Forces Expeditionary Medal (Vietnam)
- United Nations Service Medal (Korea)
- Republic of Korea War Service Medal
