= Ahr (disambiguation) =

Ahr is a tributary of the Rhine River in Germany.

AHR, AhR, Ahr, or AHr may also refer to:

== Places ==
- Ahr (South Tyrol), the Ahr tributary in South Tyrol, Italy
- Ahr Hills, range of low mountains in Germany
- Ahr (wine region), Germany

== People ==
- George W. Ahr (1904–1993), American prelate of the Roman Catholic Church
- Gustav Elijah Åhr (1996–2017), American singer and songwriter, known professionally as Lil Peep
- Timo Ahr (born 1993), German politician

== Science and medicine ==
- aHR, adjusted hazard ratio
- AHr, ampere hour
- Airway hyper-responsiveness
- Aqueous homogeneous reactor
- Aryl hydrocarbon receptor (AhR), a protein

== Organizations and companies ==
- Abbey Holford Rowe, architecture firm
- Advancing Human Rights
- Air Adriatic (ICAO airline code AHR), now defunct
- The American Historical Review, a scholarly journal

== Other ==
- Ahirani language (ISO-639-3 code ahr)
- Assisted Human Reproduction Act

== See also ==
- AAR (disambiguation)
- AH (disambiguation)
- Ahir, an Indian caste
- AHRC (disambiguation)
- AHRS, attitude and heading reference system
- AR (disambiguation)
- ARR (disambiguation)
