= Laser gyroscope =

Laser gyroscope may refer to:

- Ring laser gyroscope
- Fibre-optic gyroscope
