= Pressure reference system =

Flight instrument

Pressure reference system (PRS) is an enhancement of the inertial reference system and attitude and heading reference system designed to provide position angles measurements which are stable in time and do not suffer from long term drift caused by the sensor imperfections. The measurement system uses behavior of the International Standard Atmosphere where atmospheric pressure descends with increasing altitude and two pairs of measurement units. Each pair measures pressure at two different positions that are mechanically connected with known distance between units, e.g. the units are mounted at the tips of the wing. In horizontal flight, there is no pressure difference measured by the measurement system which means the position angle is zero. In case the airplane banks (to turn), the tips of the wings mutually change their positions, one is going up and the second one is going down, and the pressure sensors in every unit measure different values which are translated into a position angle.

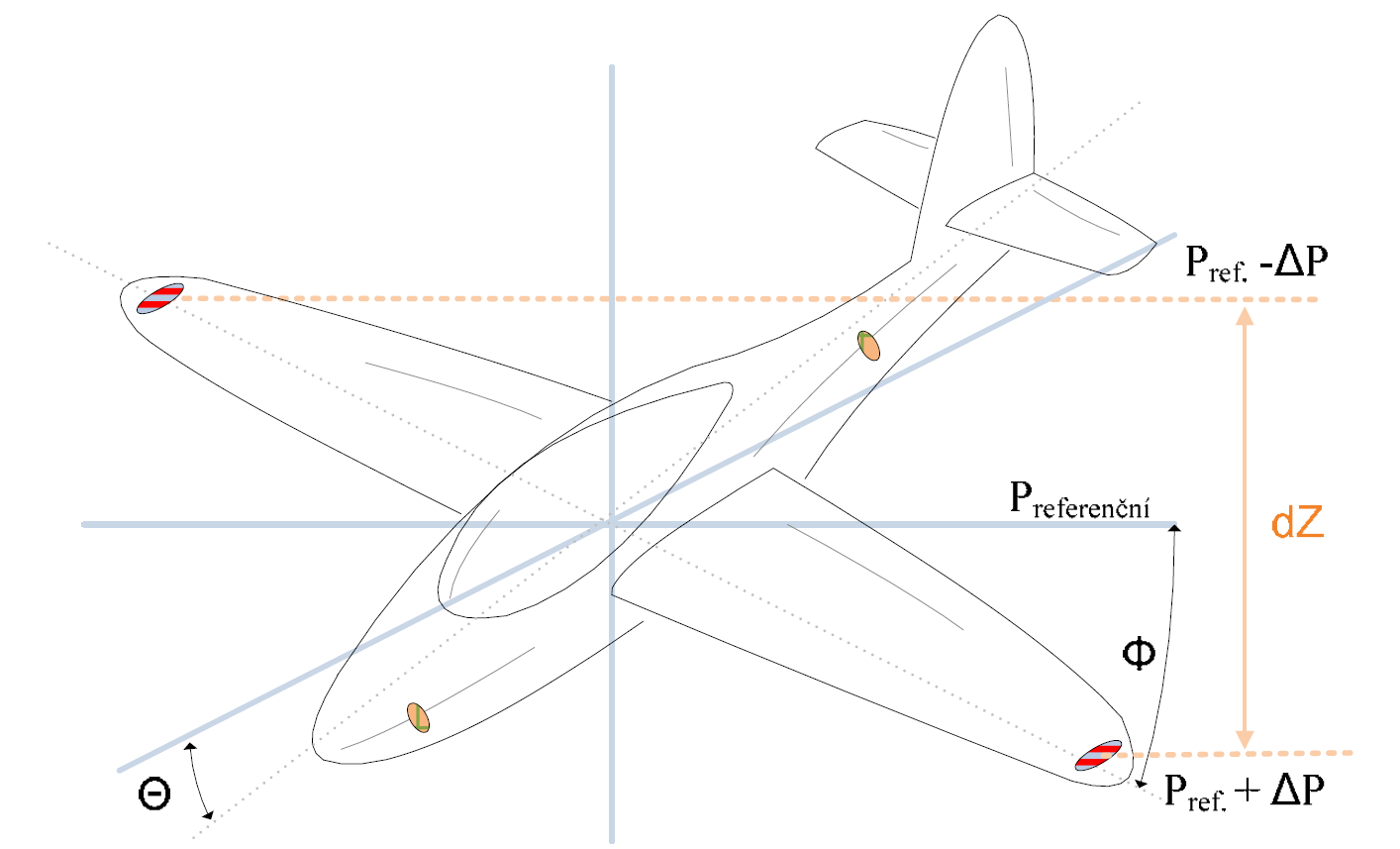
Pressure Reference System entry points

== Overview ==
The strapdown inertial navigation system uses double integration of the accelerations measured by an inertial measurement unit (IMU). This process sums the sensors outputs together with all the sensor and measurement errors. The precision and long-term stability of the INS system depends on the quality of sensors used within the IMU. The sensor quality can be evaluated by Allan Variance technique. A precise IMU uses laser gyroscopes and precise accelerometers which are expensive. The INS is a sole system with no other inputs. Nowadays the trend of the modern navigation is to integrate signals from IMU together with data provided by Global Positioning System (GPS). This approach gives long term stability to the INS output by suppressing sensor error influence on the calculation of the airplane position. The measurement system becomes attitude and heading reference system which can relax requirement on the sensor precision because the long-term stability is assured by GPS. The sensors used within AHRS are used only for position angles determination and so just one numerical integration of the angular rate measurements is required. The AHRS system is cheaper and a lot of universities and companies are developing AHRS systems based on microelectromechanical systems (MEMS) sensors. The MEMS sensors do not have performance required for navigation purposes. It is shown in an experimental research report, where the output of the navigation solution drifts away after 2 seconds. The AHRS units based on MEMS inertial sensors usually also use a vector magnetometer, a GPS receiver, and a data fusion algorithm to cope with MEMS inertial sensors errors. Next to the sensor imperfections there are also environmental parameters which influence the computed values (position angles):

- temperature effects (and humidity, pressure, etc.)
- engine vibrations
- accelerations caused by airplane movement, e.g. turns
- etc.

All these influences cause drifts in the computed output data which can confuse pilot who performs the flight.

== Pressure reference system ==
The concept of the PRS was defined by Pavel Paces in his PhD thesis where results measured under laboratory conditions were also published. Three arrangements of the PRS were evaluated:

- central sensor/sensors
- distributed sensors with separate volumes
- distributed sensors with a reference volume

While the first method gives only ambiguous results the second method works well as it can be replaced by two altimeters. Disadvantage of the second method is high measurement uncertainty of both values. This is being solved by the extension of the reference volumes used even in absolute pressure sensors.
