= Quantum gyroscope =

Device used for orientation based on quantum mechanics

A quantum gyroscope is a very sensitive device to measure angular rotation based on quantum mechanical principles. The first of these was built by Richard Packard and his colleagues at the University of California, Berkeley. The extreme sensitivity means that theoretically, a larger version could detect effects like minute changes in the rotational rate of the Earth.

== Principle ==
In 1962, Cambridge University PhD student Brian Josephson hypothesized that an electric current could travel between two superconducting materials even when they were separated by a thin insulating layer. The term Josephson effect has come to refer generically to the different behaviors that occur in any two weakly connected macroscopic quantum systems—systems composed of molecules that all possess identical wavelike properties. Among other things, the Josephson effect means that when two superfluids (zero friction fluids) are connected using a weak link and pressure is applied to the superfluid on one side of a weak link, the fluid will oscillate from one side of the weak link to the other.

This phenomenon, known as quantum whistling, occurs when pressure is applied to push a superfluid through a very small hole, somewhat as sound is produced by blowing air through an ordinary whistle. A ring-shaped tube full of superfluid, blocked by a barrier containing a tiny hole, could in principle be used to detect pressure differences caused by changes in rotational motion of the ring, in effect functioning as a sensitive gyroscope. Superfluid whistling was first demonstrated using helium-3, which has the disadvantage of being scarce and expensive, and requiring extremely low temperature (a few thousandths of a Kelvin). Common helium-4, which remains superfluid at 2 Kelvin, is much more practical, but its quantum whistling is too weak to be heard with a single practical-sized hole. This problem was overcome by using barriers with thousands of holes, in effect a chorus of quantum whistles producing sound waves that reinforced one another by constructive interference.

== Equation ==
$$I_c \propto \cos \pi \frac{2 \Omega \cdot A}{\kappa_s}$$

Where $\Omega$ is the rotation vector, A is the area vector, and $\kappa_s$ is the quantum of circulation of helium-3.

== See also ==
- Polariton interferometer
- Ring laser gyroscope
- Gyroscope
- Vibrating structure gyroscope
- Inertial measurement unit
- Hemispherical resonator gyroscope
