= HUST USV =

Unmanned ship

HUST USVs are unmanned surface vehicles developed by Huazhong University of Science and Technology (HUST), and by end of 2021, two USVs have been revealed to be in service:

== HUSTER-12S ==
HUSTER-12S is a small USV designed for surveying and patrol missions. Standard onboard equipment includes differential GPS, inertial navigation system, various cameras. HUSTER-12S can operate in either remote control or fully autonomous modes, and has been successfully deployed to demonstrate its swarm capability. Specification:

- Length (m): 1.5
- Displacement (t): 0.025
- Propulsion: electric
- Speed (kn): 20

== HUSTER-68 ==
HUSTER-68 is the larger cousin of HUSTER-12S, and it is 6.8 meters long, and like its smaller cousin HUSTER-68, it can operate in either remote control or fully autonomous modes. With standard onboard equipment including laser radar, laser rangefinder, fibre-optic gyroscope, HUSTER-68 is designed for survey, patrol, surveillance and law enforcement missions. HUSTER-68 is one of the few USV that is capable of launching and recovering UAVs. Specification:

- Length (m): 6.8
- Propulsion: Diesel with pump-jet
- Speed (kn): 30
- Endurance (nmi): 120
