= Quantum compass =

Atom-based system to determine relative location

A quantum compass is an instrument which measures relative position using the technique of atom interferometry. It includes an ensemble of accelerometers and gyroscope based on quantum technology to form an inertial navigation unit.

== Description ==
Work on quantum technology based inertial measurement units (IMUs), the instruments containing the gyroscopes and accelerometers, follows from early demonstrations of matter-wave based accelerometers and gyrometers. The first demonstration of onboard acceleration measurement was made on an Airbus A300 in 2011.

A quantum compass contains clouds of atoms frozen using lasers. By measuring the movement of these frozen particles over precise periods of time the motion of the device can be calculated. The device would then provide accurate position in circumstances where satellites are not available for satellite navigation, e.g. a fully submerged submarine.

Various defence agencies worldwide, such as the US DARPA and the United Kingdom Ministry of Defence have pushed the development of prototypes for future uses in submarines and aircraft.

In 2024, researchers from the Centre for Cold Matter of Imperial College, London, tested an experimental quantum compass on an underground train on London's District line. During the same year, scientists at the Sandia National Laboratories announced they were able to perform spatial quantum sensing using silicon photonic microchip components, a significant advancement towards the development of compact, portable and inexpensive quantum compass devices.

== See also ==
- Quantum clock
- Atomic clock
- Optical clock
- Nuclear optical clock
- Quantum metrology
- GPS jamming
