= Fibre-optic gyroscope =

Gyroscope that uses fiber optics

The interference on a Sagnac interferometer is proportional to the enclosed area. A looped fibre-optic coil multiplies the effective area by the number of loops.

A fibre-optic gyroscope (FOG) senses changes in orientation using the Sagnac effect, thus performing the function of a mechanical gyroscope. However its principle of operation is instead based on the interference of light which has passed through a coil of optical fibre, which can be as long as 5 kilometres (3 mi).

== Operation ==
Two beams from a laser are injected into the same fibre but in opposite directions. Due to the Sagnac effect, the beam travelling against the rotation experiences a slightly shorter path delay than the other beam. The resulting differential phase shift is measured through interferometry, thus translating one component of the angular velocity into a shift of the interference pattern which is measured photometrically.

Beam splitting optics split light from a laser diode (or other laser light source) into two waves propagating in both clockwise and anticlockwise directions through a coil consisting of many turns of optical fibre. The strength of the Sagnac effect is dependent on the effective area of the closed optical path: this is not simply the geometric area of the loop but is also increased by the number of turns in the coil. The FOG was first proposed by Vali and Shorthill in 1976. Development of both the passive interferometer type of FOG, or IFOG, and a newer concept, the passive ring resonator FOG, or RFOG, is proceeding in many companies and establishments worldwide.

== Uses ==
FOGs are primarily used for measuring angular velocity in navigation and attitude-control systems. They are used in aviation, aerospace and land-based applications, where their ability to measure rotation allows the orientation and movement of a vehicle to be determined.

In aircraft, FOGs can be incorporated into inertial navigation systems, to determine the aircraft's attitude and movement. Similar systems are used in certain marine vessels, particularly submarines, and in specialised land vehicles. FOG-based navigation has also been applied to directional drilling and trenchless pipeline construction, where they provide guidance underground.

In spacecraft, FOGs can be used for attitude determination and control systems, helping to measure changes in orientation during flight, which can be used for navigation. The technology has been tested by the European Space Agency and the CNES for space applications.

FOGs have also been used in seismology to measure the rotational component of seismic waves. Unlike conventional seismometers, which primarily measure translational ground movement, FOGs can measure rotational ground motion, providing additional information on earthquake ground motion.

== Advantages ==
A FOG provides extremely precise rotational rate information, in part because of its lack of cross-axis sensitivity to vibration, acceleration, and shock. Unlike the classic spinning-mass gyroscope or resonant/mechanical gyroscopes, the FOG has no moving parts and doesn't rely on inertial resistance to movement. Hence, the FOG is an excellent alternative to a mechanical gyroscope. Because of their intrinsic reliability and long lifetime, FOGs are used for high performance space applications and military inertial navigation systems.

Fibre-optic gyroscopes are increasingly valued for their resilience against Global Navigation Satellite System (GNSS) jamming and spoofing. Because FOGs operate as autonomous inertial sensors and do not rely on external satellite signals to determine rotational movement or heading, they can continue providing accurate navigation and attitude data during GPS interference events. This has become particularly important in maritime and defence applications, where deliberate GNSS disruption has increased significantly in regions such as the Black Sea, Baltic Sea, Eastern Mediterranean, and Strait of Hormuz.

The FOG typically shows a higher resolution than a ring laser gyroscope.

FOGs are implemented in both open-loop and closed-loop configurations.

== Disadvantages ==
Like all other gyroscope technologies and depending on detailed FOG design, FOGs may require initial calibration (determining which indication corresponds to zero angular velocity).

Some FOG designs are somewhat sensitive to vibrations. However, when coupled with multiple-axis FOG and accelerometers and hybridized with Global Navigational Satellite System (GNSS) data, the impact is mitigated, making FOG systems suitable for high shock environments, including gun pointing systems for 105mm and 155mm howitzers.

== See also ==
- Attitude and Heading Reference System
- Hemispherical resonator gyroscope
- Inertial measurement unit
- Inertial navigation
- Vibrating structure gyroscope
- Optical heterodyne detection
- Ring laser gyroscope
- Quantum gyroscope

== Sources ==
- Anthony Lawrence, Modern Inertial Technology: Navigation, Guidance, and Control, Springer, Chapters 11 and 12 (pages 169–207), 1998. ISBN 0-387-98507-7.
- Pavlath, G.A. (1994). "Fiber-optic gyroscopes". Proceedings of LEOS'94. Vol. 2. pp. 237–238. doi:10.1109/LEOS.1994.586467. ISBN 0-7803-1470-0. S2CID 117215647.
- R.P.G. Collinson, Introduction to Avionics Systems, 2003 Kluwer Academic Publishers, Boston. ISBN 1-4020-7278-3.
- José Miguel López-Higuer, Handbook of Fibre Optic Sensing Technology, 2000, John Wiley & Sons Ltd.
- Hervé Lefèvre, The Fiber-Optic Gyroscope, 1993, Artech House. ISBN 0-89006-537-3.
