= Peckham Technology Inc =

Coordinates: 45°44′11.5512″N 121°29′44.92″W

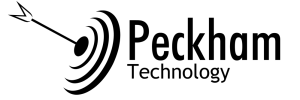
- Company type: Private
- Industry: Manufacture and Design of Complex Electronics
- Founded: White Salmon, Washington, United States (August 1, 2012)
- Founder: Canyon D. Peckham, P.E.
- Headquarters: U.S.
- Area served: Worldwide
- Key people: Canyon Peckham (President)
- Services: Electronic Design Services
- Revenue: ▲US$ undisclosed millions (2012)
- Website: www.PeckhamTechnology.com

Peckham Technology Inc is a United States corporation based in the State of Washington that develops and manufactures complex electronics for military, aviation, and consumer applications.

== Business ==
Peckham Technology Inc was founded in 2012 to perform consulting services for complex electronics in support of volume production activities.

== Designs ==
Product designs include the World's Smallest Mode C and Mode S Aviation Transponders with ADS-B In and Out, Dual-Channel ADS-B Receivers with AHRS and integrated GPS and WiFi. Areas of expertise include radio frequency communications, microcontroller and FPGA, sensors and sensing systems, ultra-miniature and low-power designs for space-constrained and power-limited environments.
