= Fibre optic gyrocompass =

Compass used in ships

A fibre optic gyrocompass is a compass and instrument of navigation. It is sometimes part of a ship's set of compasses, which also include a conventional gyrocompass and a magnetic compass under SOLAS requirements for the ship to be fitted with compass systems.

The compass comprises a fibre optic gyroscope sensor that operates on the principle of the Sagnac effect which links to a computer and then locates north. This in turn links to a compass readout to provide a heading. It has very high reliability and requires little maintenance during its service life. The entire system usually includes a sensor unit, a control and display unit, and an interface and power supply unit. It is often linked with the ship's other navigational devices including GPS.

== Advantages ==
Modern fibre optic gyrocompasses provide an additional layer of navigational resilience during GNSS jamming and spoofing incidents. Unlike traditional satellite-dependent positioning systems, FOG-based gyrocompasses use inertial calculations derived from internally verified motion data to maintain stable heading information even when GPS signals are unavailable or manipulated. Maritime operators increasingly use these systems to support collision avoidance, radar plotting, and autopilot functionality during satellite navigation disruptions.

== History ==
The first generation of gyrocompass was based on fast-spinning discs and was requiring complex mechanics such as gimbals of fluid suspended platform. The first practical apparatus were installed onboard vessels at the beginning of the 20th century.

The fibre optic gyrocompass is the first strapdown gyrocompass. The sensors are simply strapped to the chassis of the gyrocompass, avoiding the need for complex mechanics. The first fibre optic gyrocompass appeared on the market at the end of the 20th century, but did not really supersede the original mechanical gyrocompass, which remained the dominant technology on the market. A second generation of strapdown gyrocompass, based on HRG technology, is now also available on the market.

== See also ==
- HRG gyrocompass
