= Electronic compass =

Electronic compass can refer to:

- magnetometer (as in some hand-held GPS units)
- fibre optic gyrocompass (as in a ship's navigation system)
