= HRG gyrocompass =

Navigation device

A HRG gyrocompass is a compass and instrument of navigation.

It uses a hemispherical resonant gyroscope (HRG), accelerometers and computers to compute true north. The HRG gyrocompass is a complete unit, which unlike a conventional compass, has no rotating or other moving parts. It has outstanding reliability. Its operational mean time to failure (MTBF) values are improved over a fibre optic gyrocompass and also conventional mechanical gyrocompass.

It is also immune to severe environmental conditions.
