= Hemispherical resonator gyroscope =

Type of gyroscope

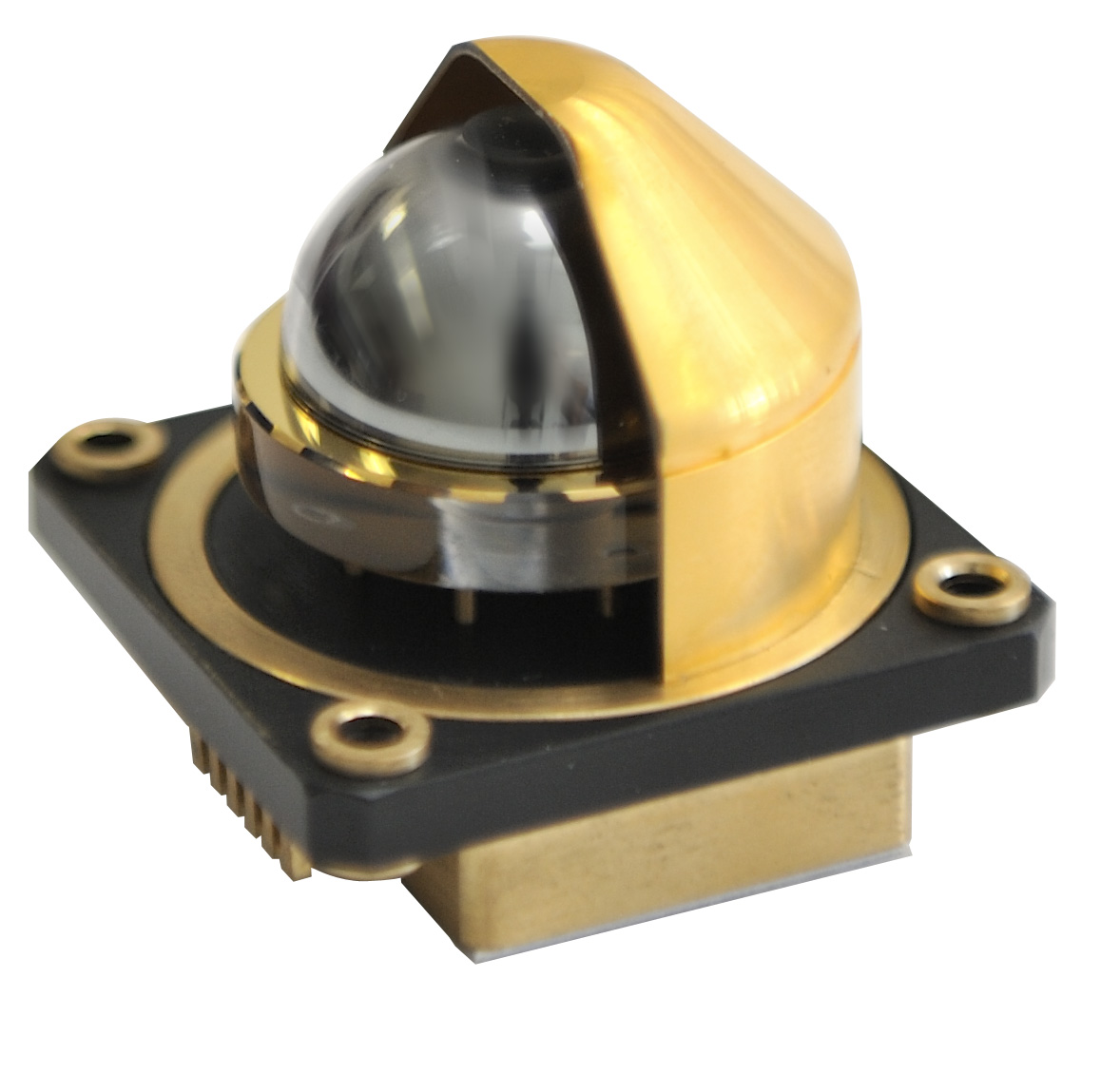
Hemispherical Resonator Gyroscope (HRG)

The hemispherical resonator gyroscope (HRG), also called wine-glass gyroscope or mushroom gyro, is a compact, low-noise, high-performance angular rate or rotation sensor. An HRG is made using a thin solid-state hemispherical shell, anchored by a thick stem. This shell is driven to a flexural resonance by electrostatic forces generated by electrodes which are deposited directly onto separate fused-quartz structures that surround the shell. The gyroscopic effect is obtained from the inertial property of the flexural standing waves. Although the HRG is a mechanical system, it has no moving parts, and can be very compact.

== Operation ==
The HRG makes use of a small thin solid-state hemispherical shell, anchored by a thick stem. This shell is driven to a flexural resonance by dedicated electrostatic forces generated by electrodes which are deposited directly onto separate fused quartz structures that surround the shell.

For a single-piece design (i.e., the hemispherical shell and stem form a monolithic part) made from high-purity fused quartz, it is possible to reach a Q factor of over 30-50 million in vacuum, thus the corresponding random walks are extremely low. The Q factor is limited by the coating (extremely thin film of gold or platinum) and by fixture losses. Such resonators have to be fine-tuned by ion-beam micro-erosion of the glass or by laser ablation in order to be perfectly dynamically balanced. When coated, tuned, and assembled within the housing, the Q factor remains over 10 million.

In application to the HRG shell, Coriolis forces cause a precession of vibration patterns around the axis of rotation. It causes a slow precession of a standing wave around this axis, with an angular rate that differs from input one. This is the wave inertia effect, discovered in 1890 by British scientist George Hartley Bryan (1864–1928). Therefore, when subject to rotation around the shell symmetry axis, the standing wave does not rotate exactly with the shell, but the difference between both rotations is nevertheless perfectly proportional to the input rotation. The device is then able to sense rotation.

The electronics which sense the standing waves are also able to drive them. Therefore, the gyros can operate in either a "whole angle mode" that sense the standing waves' position or a "force rebalance mode" that holds the standing wave in a fixed orientation with respect to the gyro.

Originally used in space applications (attitude and orbit control systems for spacecraft), HRG is now used in advanced inertial navigation systems, in attitude and heading reference systems, and HRG gyrocompasses.

== Advantages ==
The HRG is extremely reliable because of its very simple hardware (two or three pieces of machined fused quartz). It has no moving parts; its core is made of a monolithic part which includes the hemispherical shell and its stem. They have demonstrated outstanding reliability since their initial use in 1996 on the NEAR Shoemaker spacecraft.

The HRG is highly accurate and is not sensitive to external environmental perturbations. The resonating shell weighs only a few grams and it is perfectly balanced, which makes it insensitive to vibrations, accelerations, and shocks. It is extremely sensitive to temperature variations and requires very tight temperature control.

The HRG exhibits superior SWAP (size, weight, and power) characteristics compared to other gyroscope technologies.

The HRG generates neither acoustic nor radiated noise because the resonating shell is perfectly balanced and operates under vacuum.

The material of the resonator, the fused quartz, is naturally radiation hard in any space environment. This confers intrinsic immunity to deleterious space radiation effects to the HRG resonator. Thanks to the extremely high Q factor of the resonating shell, the HRG has an ultra-low angular random walk and extremely low power dissipation.

The HRG, unlike optical gyros (fibre-optic gyroscope and ring laser gyroscope), has inertial memory: if the power is lost for a short period of time (typically a few seconds), the sensitive element continues to integrate the input motion (angular rate) so that when the power returns, the HRG signals the angle turned while power was off.

== Disadvantages ==
The HRG is a high-tech device which requires sophisticated manufacturing tools and processes. The control electronics required to sense and drive the standing waves are sophisticated. This high level of sophistication limits the availability of this technology; few companies were able to produce it. Currently three companies are manufacturing HRG: Northrop Grumman, Safran Electronics & Defense and Raytheon Anschütz.

Classical HRG is relatively expensive due to the cost of the precision ground and polished hollow quartz hemispheres. This manufacturing cost restricts its use to high-added-value applications such as satellites and spacecraft. Nevertheless manufacturing costs can be dramatically reduced by design changes and engineering controls. Rather than depositing electrodes on an internal hemisphere that must perfectly match the shape of the outer resonating hemisphere, electrodes are deposited on a flat plate that matches the equatorial plane of the resonating hemisphere. In such configuration, HRG becomes very cost effective and is well suitable for high grade but cost sensitive applications.

== Applications ==
- Space – Inside the Spacecraft Bus in the James Webb Space Telescope and other satellites and spacecraft
- Sea – Marine maintenance-free gyrocompasses as well as attitude and heading reference systems. Naval navigation systems for both surface vessels and submarines.
- Land – Target locators, land navigation systems, and artillery pointing
- Air – HRG are poised to be used in commercial air transport navigation systems

== See also ==
- Fibre-optic gyroscope
- Gyroscope
- HRG gyrocompass
- Inertial measurement unit
- Quantum gyroscope
- Ring laser gyroscope
- Vibrating structure gyroscope a.k.a. Coriolis vibratory gyroscope

== Bibliography ==
- Lynch D.D. HRG Development at Delco, Litton, and Northrop Grumman. Proceedings of Anniversary Workshop on Solid-State Gyroscopy (19–21 May 2008. Yalta, Ukraine). - Kyiv-Kharkiv. ATS of Ukraine. 2009.
- L.Rosellini, JM Caron - REGYS 20: A promising HRG-based IMU for space application - 7th International ESA Conference on Guidance, Navigation & Control Systems. 2–5 June 2008, Tralee, County Kerry, Ireland
- D. Roberfroid, Y. Folope, G. Remillieux (Sagem Défense Sécurité, Paris, FRANCE) - HRG and Inertial Navigation - Inertial Sensors and Systems – Symposium Gyro Technology 2012
- A Carre, L Rosellini, O Prat (Sagem Défense Sécurité, Paris, France) HRG and North Finding -17th Saint Petersburg International Conference on Integrated Navigation Systems 31 May – 2 June 2010, Russia
- Alain Jeanroy; Gilles Grosset; Jean-Claude Goudon; Fabrice Delhaye - HRG by Sagem from laboratory to mass production - 2016 IEEE International Symposium on Inertial Sensors and Systems
- Alexandre Lenoble, Thomas Rouilleault - SWAP-oriented IMUs for multiple applications- Inertial Sensors and Systems (ISS), 2016 DGON - Karlsruhe, Germany
- Fabrice Delhaye - HRG by Safran - The game-changing technology - 2018 IEEE International Symposium on Inertial Sensors and Systems - Lake Como, Italy
- Fabrice Delhaye; Jean-Philippe Girault - SpaceNaute®, HRG technological breakthrough for advanced space launcher inertial reference system - 25th Saint Petersburg International Conference on Integrated Navigation Systems 31–29 May 2018, Russia
- B.Deleaux, Y.Lenoir - The world smallest, most accurate and reliable pure inertial navigator: ONYX™ - Inertial Sensors and Systems 2018, Braunschweig - 12 September 2018, Germany
- Y. Foloppe, Y.Lenoir - HRG CrystalTM DUAL CORE: Rebooting the INS revolution - Inertial Sensors and Systems 2019, Braunschweig - 10 September 2019, Germany
- F. Delhaye, Ch. De Leprevier - SkyNaute by Safran – How the HRG technological breakthrough benefits to a disruptive IRS (Inertial Reference System) for commercial aircraft - Inertial Sensors and Systems 2019, Braunschweig - 11 September 2019, Germany
