= AHRC =

AHRC may refer to:

- Alberta Human Rights Commission
- Asian Human Rights Commission
- Assam Human Rights Commission, India
- Assisted Human Reproduction Canada
- Arts and Humanities Research Council, UK
- Atlanta Harm Reduction Coalition, Georgia, US
- Australian Human Rights Commission

== See also ==
- AHRC New York City, formerly the Association for the Help of Retarded Children
