= Richard Packard =

American physicist

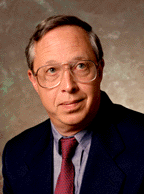
Richard E. Packard

Richard Packard is an American physicist, a professor emeritus at the University of California, Berkeley, known for discovering Josephson oscillations in superfluids and using related effects to build the first quantum gyroscope with his colleagues. He is also recognized for making the first visualization of quantum vortices as well as conceiving the idea that neutron stars suddenly speed up due to metastability of superfluid vortices in the star's interior. He also suggested a model for the nature of dark matter by drawing an analogy between cosmic strings and quantized vortex lines. His research is primarily focused on the application of quantum fluids.

Packard received his Ph.D. in Physics from the University of Michigan in 1969. After a postdoctoral appointment at the University of California at Berkeley he was appointed to the faculty in 1971. Fellowships and honors include: The Donald Sterling Noyce Prize for Excellence in Undergraduate Teaching, Fellow of the American Physical Society, Fellow of the California Academy of Sciences, Fulbright Scholar and several visiting professorships at universities abroad.

UC Berkeley Website for Richard Packard

Richard Packard Memoir
