= Timo Ahr =

German politician (born 1993)

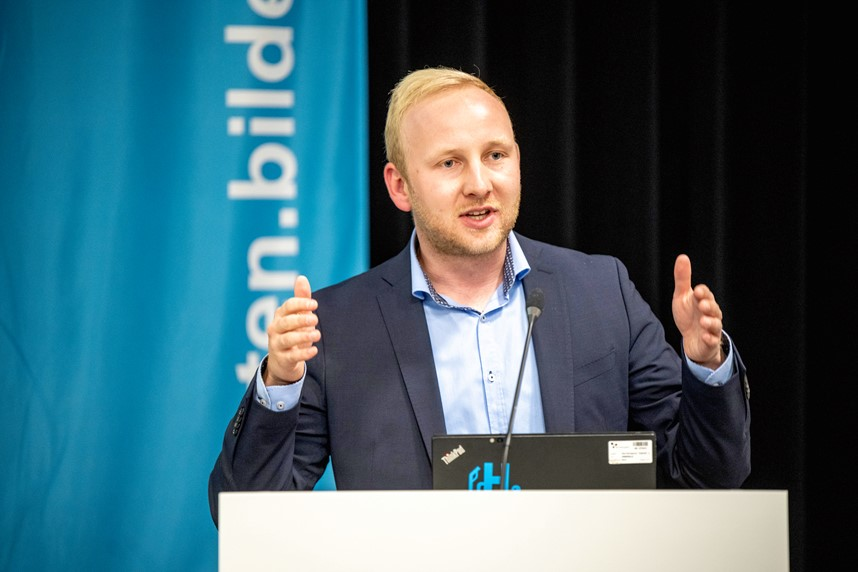
- Ahr in 2021

Member of the Landtag of Saarland
- Incumbent
- Assumed office 25 April 2022

Personal details
- Born: 22 July 1993 (age 32)
- Party: Social Democratic Party

Timo Ahr (born 22 July 1993) is a German politician serving as a member of the Landtag of Saarland since 2022. He has served as deputy chairman of the Social Democratic Party in Saarlouis since 2019.
