= Atlanta Harm Reduction Coalition =

The Atlanta Harm Reduction Coalition (often abbreviated AHRC) is an Atlanta-based non-profit organization that operates the only needle exchange program in Georgia. Such programs were illegal in the state until 2019. The organization was formally incorporated in 1995. The AHRC's needle exchange program is also the largest and most comprehensive such program in the South. The program is conducted twice a week in the Atlanta neighborhood The Bluff. A third weekly needle exchange was added in the Little Five Points neighborhood. In 2015, the North Carolina Harm Reduction Coalition filmed a documentary about the AHRC.
