= ARR =

ARR or Arr may refer to:

== People ==
- A. R. Rahman (born 1967), Indian film composer, record producer, musician and singer
- Jonny Arr (born 1988), English rugby union player

== Places ==
- Arr, Mauritania, a town

== Science and technology ==
- Absolute risk reduction, a statistical term used in biostatistics and epidemiology
- Address-range register, in computer hardware
- Aldosterone-to-renin ratio, a hormone/enzyme blood concentration
- Application Request Routing, a proxy-based routing module for Internet Information Services, a Windows-based web server

== Transportation ==
- Air Armenia, ICAO airline code ARR
- Alaska Railroad, reporting mark ARR
- Alberta Resources Railway
- Arram railway station, England, National Rail code ARR
- Aurora Municipal Airport, Illinois, FAA airport code ARR
- Alto Río Senguer Airport, Argentina, IATA code ARR

== Other uses ==
- "Arr!", a phrase used by pirates in popular culture
- Average Run Rate method, in cricket
- Accounting rate of return, a financial ratio
- Aeronautica Regala Romana, or Royal Romanian Air Force
- Ramarama language, ISO 639-3 code arr
- Artist's resale right or droit de suite, royalties to the original artist upon resale
- Annual Recurring Revenue is a type of revenue stream
- All rights reserved, a copyright notice
- Arranged by
