= BRP Rajah Humabon (PS-22) =

Philippine Navy offshore patrol vessel

- The future BRP Rajah Humabon (PS-22) during her launching at HD HHI Ulsan Shipyard on 13 October 2026.

Philippines
- Name: BRP Rajah Humabon
- Namesake: Rajah Humabon, a Sugbuanon ruler during the arrival of Ferdinand Magellan in 1521.
- Ordered: 27 June 2022
- Builder: HD Hyundai Heavy Industries
- Cost: KRW 770.9 billion (~US$556 million)
- Yard number: P174
- Launched: 13 October 2026
- Identification: PS-22
- Status: Under construction

General characteristics
- Class & type: Rajah Sulayman-class offshore patrol vessel
- Displacement: 2,400 tonnes / 2,450 tonnes
- Length: 94.5 m (310 ft 0 in)
- Beam: 14.3 m (46 ft 11 in)
- Draft: 3.6 m (11 ft 10 in)
- Propulsion: Combined diesel and diesel (CODAD) arrangement: 2 × Hyundai HiMSEN diesel engines 18H25/33V (18-cylinder V-type)
- Speed: 22 knots (41 km/h; 25 mph) at 85% MCR
- Range: 5,500 nmi (10,200 km; 6,300 mi) at 15 knots (28 km/h; 17 mph)
- Endurance: 30 days
- Boats & landing craft carried: 1 × 7.3 m RHIB (starboard boat bay); 1 × 9.5 m RHIB (stern launching and recovery system)
- Complement: 72
- Sensors & processing systems: Hanwha combat management system; Leonardo SPS-732 X-band 2D air/surface surveillance radar; Identification Friend or Foe (IFF) system; Hensoldt UK SharpEye Mk.11 I-band navigation radar; Safran PASEO XLR extra-long-range optronic sensor suite; Anschütz Synapsis NX integrated navigation and bridge systems
- Electronic warfare & decoys: Radar-Electronic Support Measures (R-ESM); 2 × C-Guard DL-6T 6-tube 130 mm IR and RF decoy launchers
- Armament: 1 × 76 mm Oto Melara Super Rapid main gun; 2 × 30 mm SMASH RCWS secondary guns; 2 × 12.7 mm heavy machine guns; 2 × Sitep Italia MASS SX-424(V)122 Multirole Acoustic Stabilized System and Laser Dazzler
- Aircraft carried: 1 × 10-tonne class naval helicopter
- Aviation facilities: Flight deck optimized for a 10-tonne helicopter and two unmanned aerial vehicles
- Notes: Stern mission bay for multi-mission module containers and towed array sonar

BRP Rajah Humabon (PS-22) is the third ship of the Rajah Sulayman-class offshore patrol vessels operated by the Philippine Navy. She is the second naval vessel named in honor of Rajah Humabon, the ruler of pre-colonial Cebu during the arrival of Portuguese explorer Ferdinand Magellan in 1521.

== Design ==
The vessel was designed and constructed by HD Hyundai Heavy Industries (HD HHI) in Ulsan, South Korea. Its design is based on the builder's HDP-2200+ patrol vessel platform, which is an optimized development of the earlier HDP-2200 design. The design layout shares structural commonalities with other HD HHI surface assets built for the Philippine Navy, specifically the Jose Rizal-class frigates. Structural considerations were integrated to lower the ship's radar cross-section, featuring clean lines, flattened exterior surface geometry, and minimized structural overhangs.

== Construction and career ==
Philippine Navy, DND and HD HHI officials behind the newly launched future BRP Rajah Humabon (PS-22) at HD HHI Ulsan Shipyard

The ship was launched at the HD HHI shipyard on 13 October 2026. The ship is expected to complete its port-side fit-out works, pier and sea trials from October 2026 to early 2027, with delivery to the Philippine Navy expected by 1st quarter of 2027.

== See also ==
- BRP Rajah Humabon (PS-11)
