= BRP Rajah Lakandula (PS-21) =

Philippine Navy offshore patrol vessel

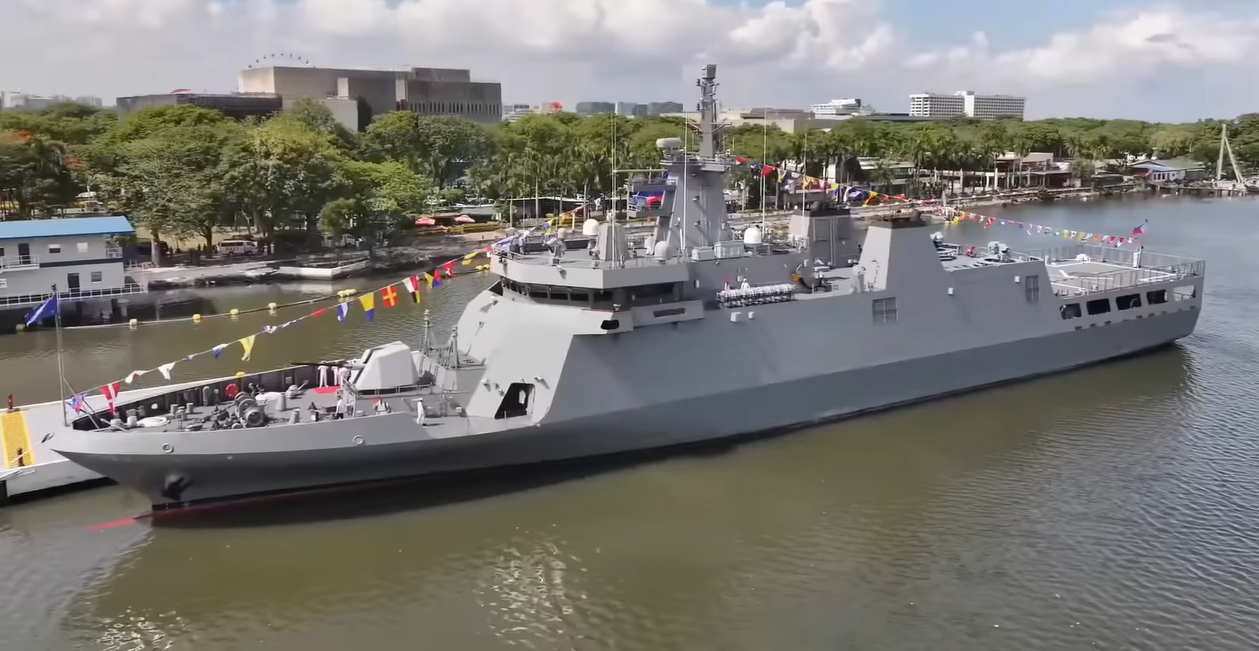
- The BRP Rajah Lakandula (PS-21) during her commissioning ceremony on 12 June 2026.

Philippines
- Name: BRP Rajah Lakandula
- Namesake: Rajah Lakandula, the last Paramount Ruler of the Kingdom of Tondo
- Ordered: 27 June 2022
- Builder: HD Hyundai Heavy Industries
- Cost: KRW 770.9 billion (~US$556 million)
- Yard number: P173
- Launched: 20 November 2025
- Commissioned: 9 June 2026
- Identification: PS-21
- Status: Active
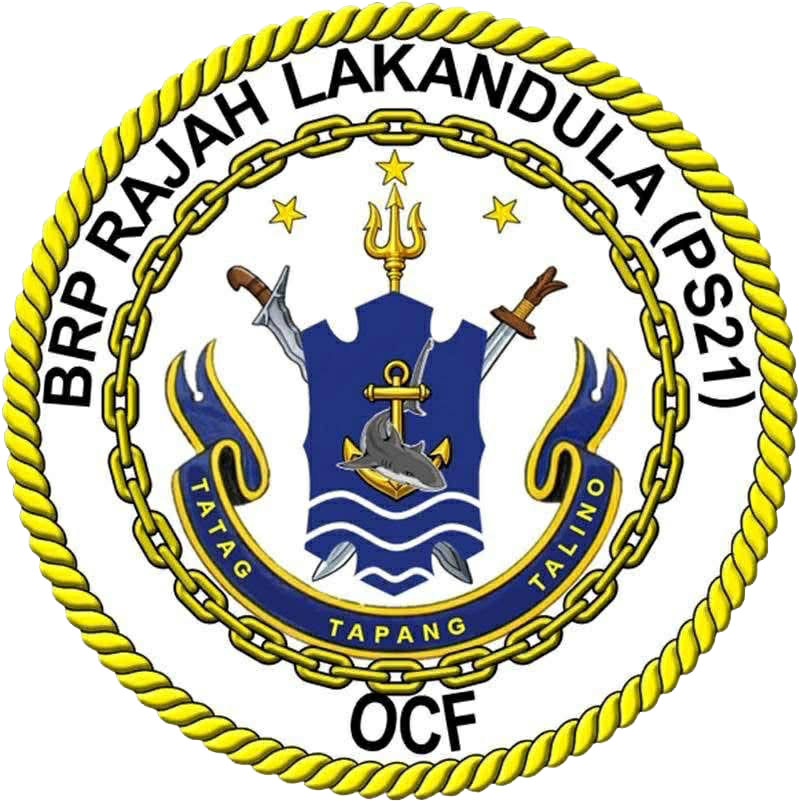
- Badge

General characteristics
- Class & type: Rajah Sulayman-class offshore patrol vessel
- Displacement: 2,400 tonnes / 2,450 tonnes
- Length: 94.5 m (310 ft 0 in)
- Beam: 14.3 m (46 ft 11 in)
- Draft: 3.6 m (11 ft 10 in)
- Propulsion: Combined diesel and diesel (CODAD) arrangement: 2 × Hyundai HiMSEN diesel engines 18H25/33V (18-cylinder V-type)
- Speed: 22 knots (41 km/h; 25 mph) @ 85% MCR
- Range: 5,500 nmi (10,200 km; 6,300 mi) @ 15 knots (28 km/h; 17 mph)
- Endurance: 30 days
- Boats & landing craft carried: 1 × 7.3 m RHIB (starboard boat bay); 1 × 9.5 m RHIB (stern launching and recovery system)
- Complement: 72
- Sensors & processing systems: Hanwha combat management system; Leonardo SPS-732 X-band 2D air/surface surveillance radar; Identification Friend or Foe (IFF) system; Hensoldt UK SharpEye Mk.11 I-band navigation radar; Safran PASEO XLR extra-long-range optronic sensor suite; Anschütz Synapsis NX integrated navigation and bridge systems
- Electronic warfare & decoys: Radar-Electronic Support Measures (R-ESM); 2 × C-Guard DL-6T 6-tube 130mm IR and RF decoy launchers
- Armament: 1 × 76 mm Oto Melara Super Rapid main gun; 2 × 30 mm SMASH RCWS secondary guns; 2 × 12.7 mm heavy machine guns; 2 × Sitep Italia MASS SX-424(V)122 Multirole Acoustic Stabilized System and Laser Dazzler
- Aircraft carried: 1 × 10-tonne class naval helicopter
- Aviation facilities: Flight deck optimized for a 10-tonne helicopter and two unmanned aerial vehicles
- Notes: Stern mission bay for multi-mission module containers and towed array sonar

BRP Rajah Lakandula (PS-21) is the second ship of the Rajah Sulayman-class offshore patrol vessels operated by the Philippine Navy. She is the second naval vessel named in honor of Rajah Lakandula, the historic ruler of the Kingdom of Tondo.

== Design ==
The vessel was designed and constructed by HD Hyundai Heavy Industries (HD HHI) in Ulsan, South Korea. Its design is based on the builder's HDP-2200+ patrol vessel platform, which is an optimized development of the earlier HDP-2200 design. The design layout shares structural commonalities with other HD HHI surface assets built for the Philippine Navy, specifically the Jose Rizal-class frigates. Structural considerations were integrated to lower the ship's radar cross-section, featuring clean lines, flattened exterior surface geometry, and minimized structural overhangs.

== Construction and career ==
The ship was launched at the HD HHI shipyard on 20 November 2025. Following the completion of manufacturer sea trials, the vessel was delivered to the Philippine Navy and arrived at the Subic Bay naval facility on 8 May 2026.

On 9 June 2026, President Bongbong Marcos presided over the formal commissioning ceremony of BRP Rajah Lakandula into active fleet service. The event was held in conjunction with the 128th founding anniversary of the Philippine Navy. The offshore patrol vessel is slated for frontline maritime security deployments, with an operational focus on reinforcing maritime domain awareness within the West Philippine Sea.

== See also ==
- BRP Rajah Lakandula (PF-4)
