= Rajah Sulayman-class patrol vessel =

Class of warships

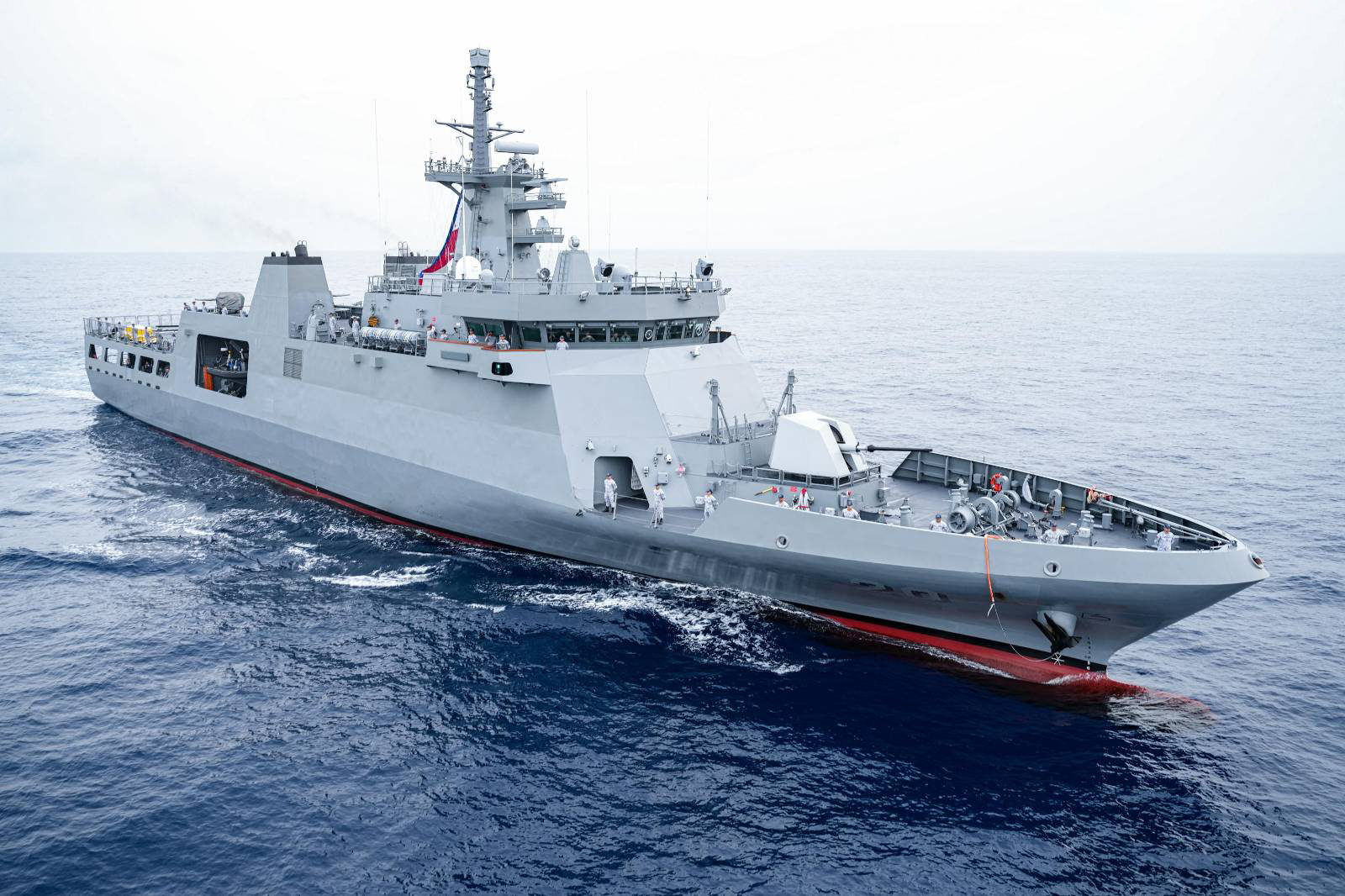
- Lead ship BRP Rajah Sulayman (PS-20)

Class overview
- Name: Rajah Sulayman class
- Builders: Hyundai Heavy Industries
- Operators: Philippine Navy
- Preceded by: Jacinto-class patrol vessel
- Cost: PH₱5.0B or $95.5M per ship (in 2021) (Note: Cost per ship in 2022, with the June contract signing phase offered at the 2021 exchange rate. Roughly equivalent to ₱5 billion in 2021 PH pesos or $113.5 million in 2025 US dollars.)
- Built: 2024–2028
- In commission: 2025–present
- Planned: 6
- Building: 4
- Completed: 2
- Active: 2

General characteristics
- Type: Offshore patrol vessel
- Displacement: 2,400 tonnes/2,450 tonnes
- Length: 94.5 m (310 ft 0 in)
- Beam: 14.3 m (46 ft 11 in)
- Draft: 3.6 m (11 ft 10 in)
- Propulsion: Combined diesel and diesel (CODAD) arrangement: 2 x Hyundai HiMSEN diesel engines 18H25/33V 18-Cylinder V-type
- Speed: 22 knots (41 km/h; 25 mph) at 85% MCR
- Range: 5,500 nmi (10,200 km; 6,300 mi) at 15 knots (28 km/h; 17 mph)
- Endurance: 30 days
- Boats & landing craft carried: 1 x 7.3m RHIB in starboard boat bay; 1 x 9.5m RHIB in stern launching and recovery system
- Complement: 72
- Sensors & processing systems: Hanwha combat management system; Leonardo SPS-732 X-band 2D air/surface surveillance radar; Identification Friend or Foe (IFF) System; Hensoldt UK SharpEye Mk.11 I-band navigation radar; Safran PASEO XLR extra-long-range optronic sensor suite; Anschütz Synapsis NX integrated nav and bridge systems
- Electronic warfare & decoys: Radar-Electronic Support Measures (R-ESM); EW Countermeasures; 2 × C-Guard DL-6T 6-tube 130mm IR and RF decoy launchers
- Armament: 1 × 76 mm Oto Melara Super Rapid main gun; 2 × 30 mm Aselsan SMASH 200/30 RCWS secondary guns; 2 × 12.7 mm heavy machine guns; 2 × SitepItalia MASS CS-524 acoustic hailer and laser dazzler
- Aircraft carried: 1 × 10-tonne naval helicopter
- Aviation facilities: Flight deck for a 10-tonne helicopter and two (2) unmanned aerial vehicle
- Notes: Mission bay; Stern mission bay for multi-mission module containers and towed array sonar

The Rajah Sulayman class is a series of six offshore patrol vessels designed and built by Hyundai Heavy Industries (HHI) for the Philippine Navy. The Philippine Navy is expecting the delivery of six new offshore patrol vessels acquired under its Offshore Patrol Vessel Acquisition Project under the Revised AFP Modernization Program's Horizon 2 phase covering the years 2018 to 2022. The Philippines' Department of National Defense (DND) signed a contract with South Korean shipbuilder HHI on 27 June 2022, with the shipbuilder delivering a variant of their HDP-2200+ offshore patrol vessel design.

== Development ==
=== Concept design ===
The Philippine Navy included plans to procure six new next-generation offshore patrol vessels as part of its Horizon 2 modernization phase, with a proposed budget of PHP 30 billion (US $555 million) among those approved in principle by Philippine President Rodrigo Duterte in June 2018.

During the pre-procurement development phase, the Technical Working Group (TWG) assigned to the project used the Philippine Navy's experience in specifying and building its latest warship, the Jose Rizal-class frigate, as there were numerous lessons learned from the project's development and construction from 2016 to 2020. Based on open-source information, the new patrol vessels would be smaller, less equipped, less armed than frigates and corvettes, and designed more for low to medium-intensity conflicts and peacetime operations.

Required systems are believed to include the following:

- an improved combat management system (CMS) compared to the one installed on the Jose Rizal-class frigate;
- a 2D air/surface search radar system;
- a secondary surface search/navigation radar system;
- a fire control radar (FCR);
- an electro-optical tracking system (EOTS);
- a radar electronic support measures (R-ESM) system;
- a radio detection finder (RDF);
- no sonar system

Weapon systems required by the specifications are the following:

- an Oto Melara 76 mm Super Rapid naval gun;
- two 30mm secondary naval guns;
- two manually operated 12.7 mm heavy machine guns;

=== Selection ===
In 2019, Austal unveiled the design for its 83-meter offshore patrol vessel pitch to the Philippine Navy. It was reported that negotiations were ongoing under a government-to-government scheme. These vessels would be constructed at Austal's facilities in the Philippines. At the time Austal was favored to win the contract. However, rising costs of construction led to an estimated cost overrun of 40% (Php 12 billion) over the project budget of Php 30 billion, leading the Philippine government to decline Austal's offer and end negotiations. This subsequently led the Philippine Navy to opt to pursue sole-source foreign-built OPVs.

Several offers were made to the Philippine Navy to meet the requirements for new OPVs, including proposals coming from South Korea's Hyundai Heavy Industries, Turkey's ASFAT, Israel Shipyards, Thailand's Bangkok Dock Company, France's Naval Group, Dutch shipbuilder Damen Group, and India's Goa Shipyard.

The Department of National Defense eventually decided that the project would be procured under negotiated process, and undertaken through Government-to-Government (G2G) process, which means a support and participation of the government of the shipbuilder's country of origin.

By 2021, South Korea's Hyundai Heavy Industries and Turkey's ASFAT were shortlisted for the project. HHI offered their HDP-1500 Neo patrol vessel design. On the other hand, ASFAT offered a revised version of their VARD-7 86-meter patrol vessel design.

Ultimately, Hyundai Heavy Industries was selected as the winning contractor for the project, with a Notice of Award released by the DND around May or June 2022, and a contract signed on 27 June 2022.

=== HHI HDP-2200+ design ===
During the contract signing with the Philippine Department of National Defense, Hyundai Heavy Industries indicated that their offer will be based on their 2,400-ton HDP-2200 corvette design. This was an enlarged and improved version of the HDP-1500 Neo OPV design which was believed to be the benchmark of HHI's offer to the Philippines and was first unveiled at the International Maritime Defense Industry Exhibition (MADEX) 2022 in South Korea, with an enlarged hull and other improvements to fit the requirements of the Philippine Navy.

As Critical Design Review was conducted, HHI's designation on the OPV offered to the Philippine Navy was later changed to the HDP-2200+ OPV design, as confirmed by HHI during Euronaval 2022 defense exhibition in Paris, France in October 2022. A scale model of the HDP-2200+ was shown at Euronaval 2022.

Aside from helicopter landing deck, the ship would also have a space to operate two (2) Unmanned Aerial System, a stern launching and recovery system for rigid-hull inflatable boats (RHIB), and spaces for containerized mission modules.

International accredited registrar DNV awarded Hyundai Heavy Industries an approval in principle (AiP) for the new HDP-2200 Offshore Patrol Vessel design, certifying its compliance to regulatory requirements.

=== Confirmed subsystems ===
Kongsberg Maritime has confirmed that they will be supplying Kamewa 86 A/5 D-B Controllable Pitch Propeller systems to HHI, which will installed on the new offshore patrol vessels being built for the Philippine Navy, with deliveries starting in August 2024.

Hensoldt UK was awarded a contract to supply Mk11 SharpEye navigation radars for HHI's Philippine Navy ship projects. The radars will be fitted on both the 3,200-ton corvettes and the 2,400-ton offshore patrol vessels currently being developed and constructed by HHI for the Philippine Navy. These radars will provide navigation and surface search capabilities for the vessels.

Anschütz Singapore announced that it had secured the contract to provide its Synapsis NX integrated navigation system for Hyundai Heavy Industry's Philippine Navy OPV project.

In 2023 May 12, Hanwha Systems announced they won a contract to supply CMS and TDL (tactical data link) for the six Philippine Navy HDP-2400 OPVs.The CMS deal totaled $29.5M or ~$5M per package, while the TDL deal totaled $5M or ~$830K per package. This is Hanwha's 4th export contract to the Philippine Navy, bringing it from 7 to 13 CMS units.

In an interview with Naval News, Safran has confirmed that their PASEO XLR extra-long range optronic identification & fire control system will be installed on the 2 HDC-3100 corvettes and 6 HDP-2200 offshore patrol vessels being built by HD Hyundai for the Philippine Navy.

GeoSpectrum Technologies Inc. of Canada was selected by Hyundai Heavy Industries to supply three (3) units of its TRAPS ("Towed Reelable Active Passive Sonar") towed-array sonar system as part of the weapons and sensor systems acquisition project of the Philippine Navy for the Rajah Sulayman-class offshore patrol vessels.

== Construction ==
In an interview conducted in September 2023, PN vice commander Rear Adm. Caesar Bernard Valencia said that the navy expected that it would receive the 6 HDP-2200 OPVs it had ordered from 2026 to 2028.

== Ships in class ==
| Name | Project Number | Hull number | Builder | Laid down | Launched | Commissioned | Status |
|---|---|---|---|---|---|---|---|
| Rajah Sulayman | P172 | PS-20 | Hyundai Heavy Industries | 5 Feb 2025 | 11 June 2025 | 24 February 2026 | Active |
| Rajah Lakandula | P173 | PS-21 | Hyundai Heavy Industries | TBC | 20 November 2025 | 9 June 2026 | Active |
| Rajah Humabon | TBC | PS-22 | Hyundai Heavy Industries | TBC | 13 October 2026 | February 2027 | Fitting up |
| Sultan Kudarat | TBC | PS-23 | Hyundai Heavy Industries | TBC | TBC | TBC | Under construction |
| Datu Marikudo | TBC | PS-24 | Hyundai Heavy Industries | TBC | TBC | TBC | Under construction |
| Datu Sikatuna | TBC | PS-25 | Hyundai Heavy Industries | TBC | TBC | 2028 | Under construction |

== See also ==
- List of equipment of the Philippine Navy
