= BRP Rajah Sulayman =

Philippine Navy offshore patrol vessel

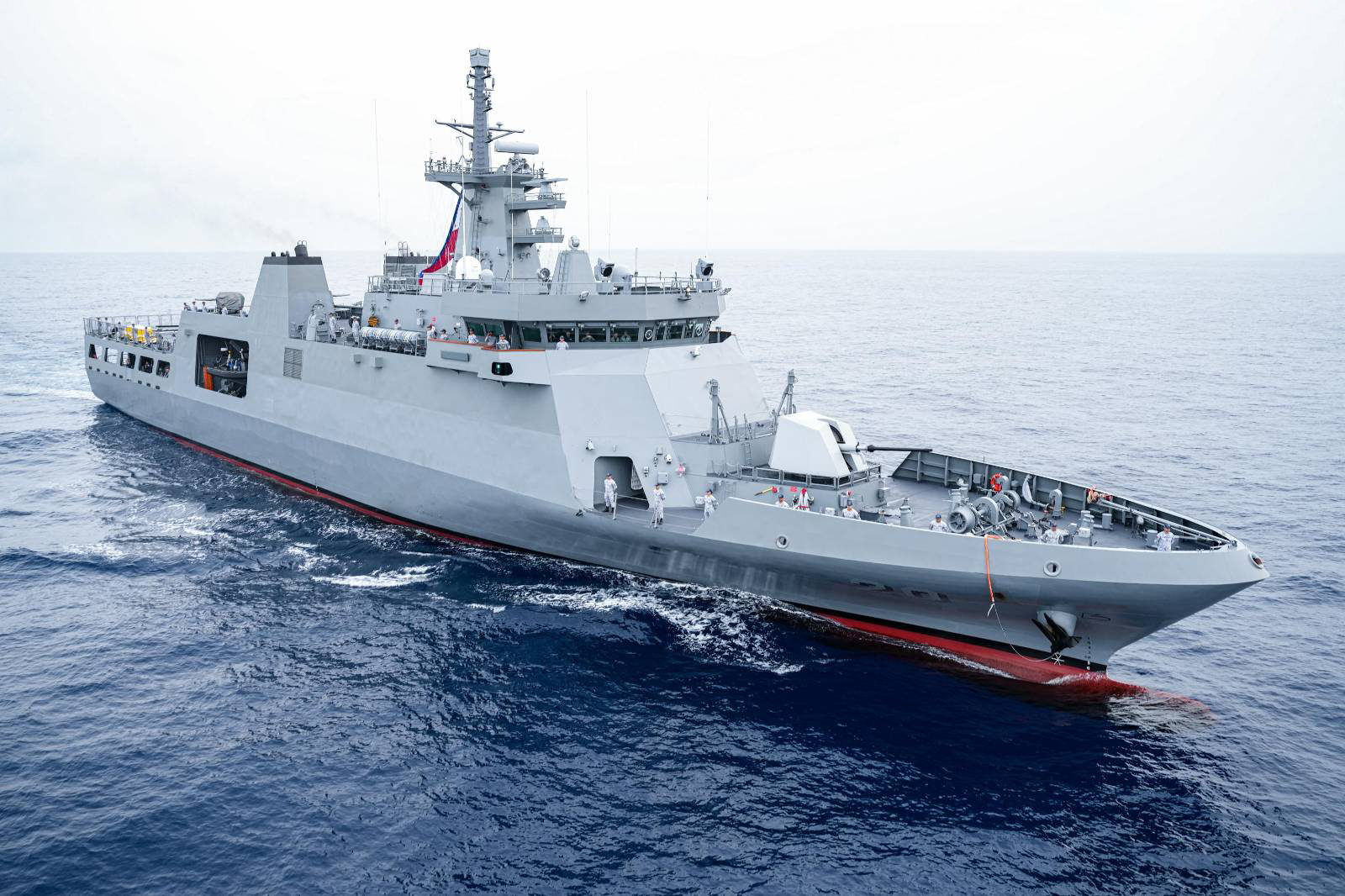
- BRP Rajah Sulayman (PS-20) during her delivery cruise to the Philippines on January 2026.

Philippines
- Name: BRP Rajah Sulayman
- Namesake: Rajah Sulayman III, 14th Rajah of the Kingdom of Maynila
- Ordered: 27 June 2022
- Builder: HD Hyundai Heavy Industries
- Cost: KRW770.9 billion (~US$556 million)
- Yard number: P172
- Laid down: 05 February 2025
- Launched: 11 June 2025
- Commissioned: 24 February 2026
- Identification: PS-20
- Status: Active
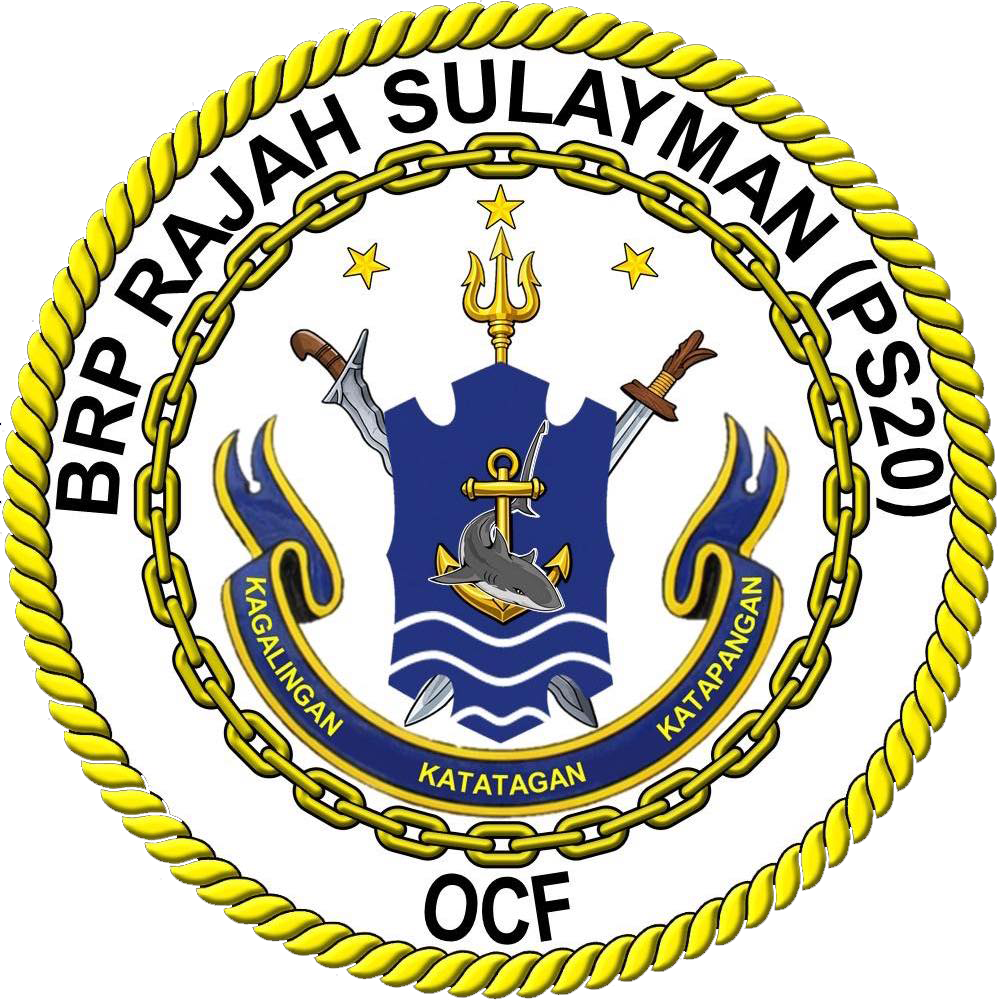
- Badge

General characteristics
- Class & type: Rajah Sulayman-class offshore patrol vessel
- Displacement: 2,400 tonnes/2,450 tonnes
- Length: 94.5 m (310 ft 0 in)
- Beam: 14.3 m (46 ft 11 in)
- Draft: 3.6 m (11 ft 10 in)
- Propulsion: Combined diesel and diesel (CODAD) arrangement: 2 x Hyundai HiMSEN diesel engines 18H25/33V 18-Cylinder V-type
- Speed: 22 knots (41 km/h; 25 mph) @ 85% MCR
- Range: 5,500 nmi (10,200 km; 6,300 mi) @ 15 knots (28 km/h; 17 mph)
- Endurance: 30 days
- Boats & landing craft carried: 1 x 7.3m RHIB in starboard boat bay; 1 x 9.5m RHIB in stern launching and recovery system
- Complement: 72
- Sensors & processing systems: Hanwha combat management system; Leonardo SPS-732 X-band 2D air/surface surveillance radar; Identification Friend or Foe (IFF) System; Hensoldt UK SharpEye Mk.11 I-band navigation radar; Safran PASEO XLR extra-long-range optronic sensor suite; Anschütz Synapsis NX integrated nav and bridge systems
- Electronic warfare & decoys: Radar-Electronic Support Measures (R-ESM); EW Countermeasures; 2 × C-Guard DL-6T 6-tube 130mm IR and RF decoy launchers
- Armament: 1 × 76mm Oto Melara Super Rapid main gun; 2 × 30mm SMASH RCWS secondary guns; 2 × 12.7mm heavy machine guns; 2 × SitepItalia it:Multirole Acoustic Stabilized System MASS SX-424(V)122 Acoustic Hailer and Laser Dazzler
- Aircraft carried: 1 × 10 tonne naval helicopter
- Aviation facilities: Flight deck for a 10-tonne helicopter and two (2) unmanned aerial vehicle
- Notes: Mission Bay; Stern mission bay for multi-mission module containers and towed array sonar

BRP Rajah Sulayman (PS-20) is the lead ship of her class of offshore patrol vessels of the Philippine Navy. She is the second ship to be named after Rajah Sulayman III, the 14th Rajah of the Kingdom of Maynila who fought the Spanish conquest from 1570.

The ship was constructed by South Korean naval shipbuilder HD Hyundai Heavy Industry in their facility in Ulsan, South Korea, and was delivered to the Philippine Navy in January 2026. The ship was commissioned with the Philippine Navy's Offshore Combat Force at the Naval Operating Base Subic on 24 February 2026.

== Construction and design ==
The ship named as the BRP Rajah Sulayman was designed and built by HD Hyundai Heavy Industries (HD HHI) of South Korea, and is based on the shipbuilder's HDP-2200+ patrol vessel design, which is an improved version of the earlier HDP-2200 design. The design was heavily influenced by the base design of the other ship designs of HD HHI, including the Jose Rizal-class frigate built for the Philippine Navy, considering reduced radar cross-section by having cleaner lines, smooth surface design, and reduced overhangs.

The ship held its First Steel Cutting Ceremony on 11 May 2023 at HD HHI's facility in Ulsan, South Korea. Its Keel Laying Ceremony was held on 5 February 2024.

The ship was launched on 11 June 2025.

== See also ==
- RPS Rajah Soliman (D-66)
