= Rail inspection =

Prevention of railway accidents by examining rail tracks for flaws

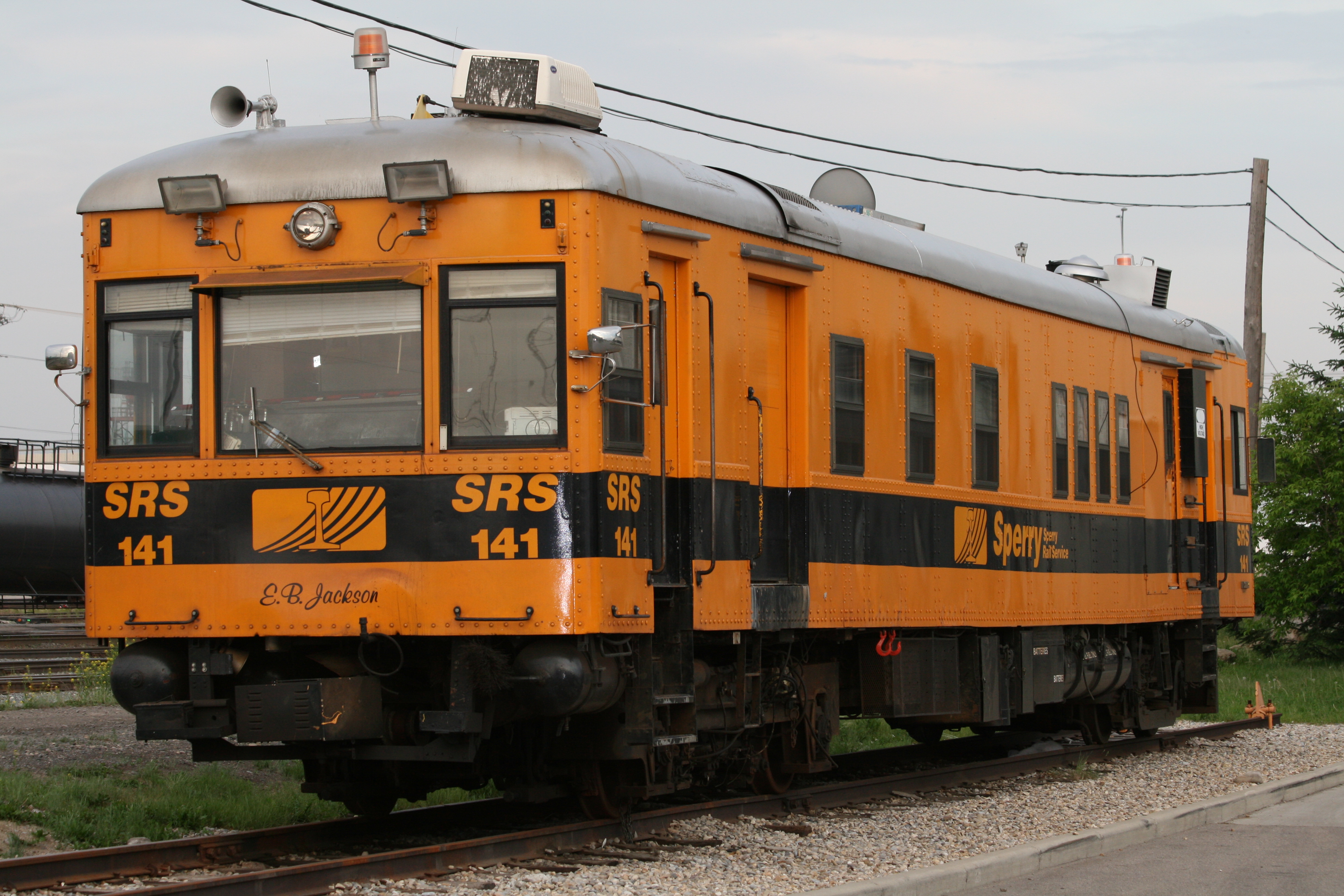
An original Sperry Rail Service rail-bound detection car.

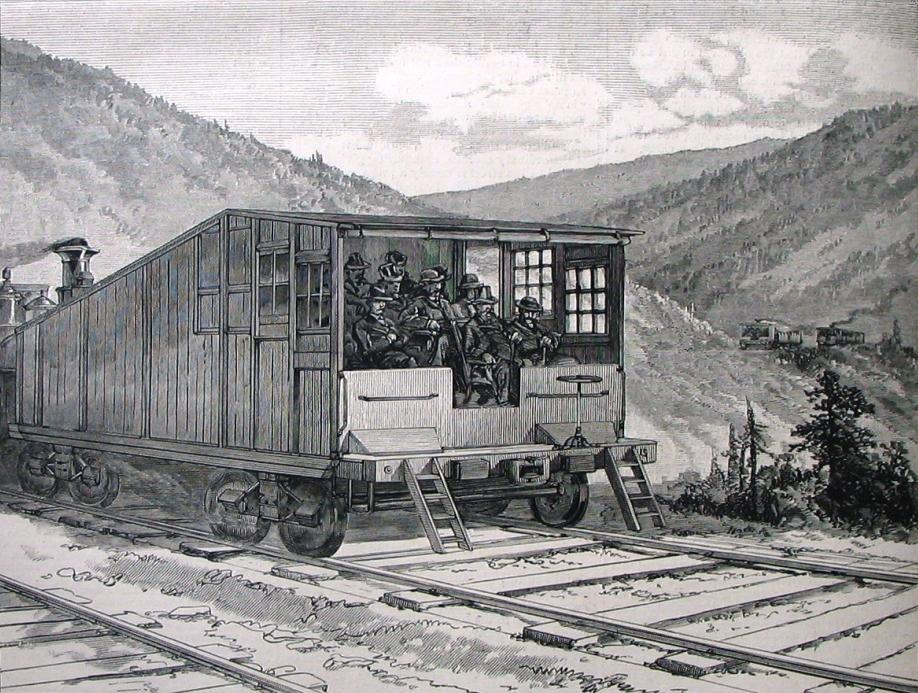
An Inspection Car on the Pennsylvania Railroad, an 1882 wood engraving from Harper's Weekly

Rail inspection is the practice of examining rail tracks for flaws that could lead to catastrophic failures. According to the United States Federal Railroad Administration Office of Safety Analysis, track defects are the second leading cause of accidents on railways in the United States. The leading cause of railway accidents is attributed to human error. The contribution of poor management decisions to rail accidents caused by infrequent or inadequate rail inspections is significant, but is not reported by the FRA; only the NTSB reports it. Every year, North American railroads spend millions of dollars to inspect the rails for internal and external flaws. Nondestructive testing (NDT) methods are used as preventive measures to prevent track failures and potential derailments.

== History ==
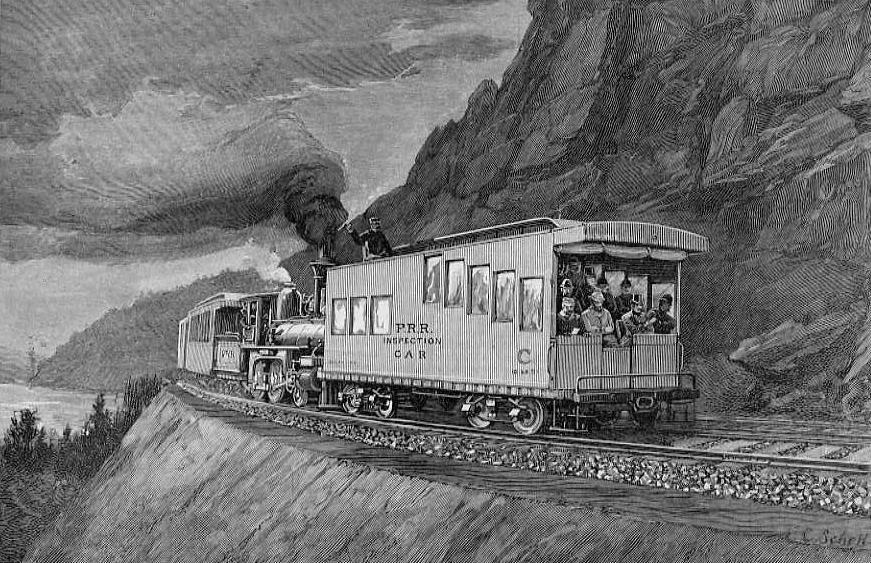
An Inspection Car En Route, 1891

The first rail inspections were done visually and with the Oil and Whiting Method (an early form of Liquid Penetrant Inspection). Many sources cite the need for better rail inspections as having arisen after a derailment in Manchester, New York, in 1911. That particular accident resulted in the death of 29 people and injuries to 60 others. The investigation of the accident revealed that the cause was a rail with a transverse fissure — a critical crack perpendicular to the rail's length. Further investigation in the late 1920s showed that this type of defect was quite common. With increased rail traffic at higher speeds and with heavier axle loads today, critical crack sizes are shrinking, and rail inspection is becoming more important. In 1927, Dr. Elmer Sperry built a massive rail inspection car under contract with the American Railway Association. Magnetic induction was the method used on the first rail inspection cars. This was done by passing a large magnetic field through the rail and detecting flux leakage with search coils. Since then, many other inspection cars have traversed the rails in search of flaws. In 1949, ultrasonic flaw detection was introduced by Sperry Rail Service (Named after Dr. Elmer Sperry). By the 1960s, Ultrasonic Inspection Systems had been added to the entire Sperry Fleet. Rail inspection continues to advance today. Companies like Sperry Rail Service, Nordco Inc, Herzog Rail Testing, and many others continue to develop an ever-increasing array of technologies to detect internal flaws.

== Defects and location ==
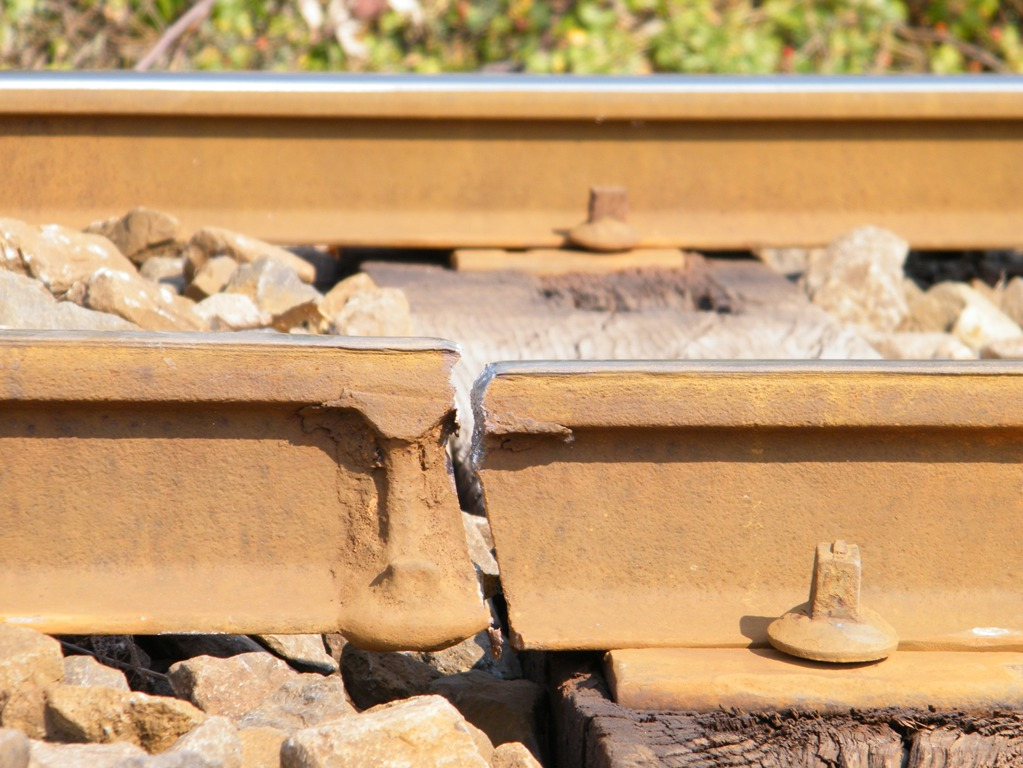
Broken rail

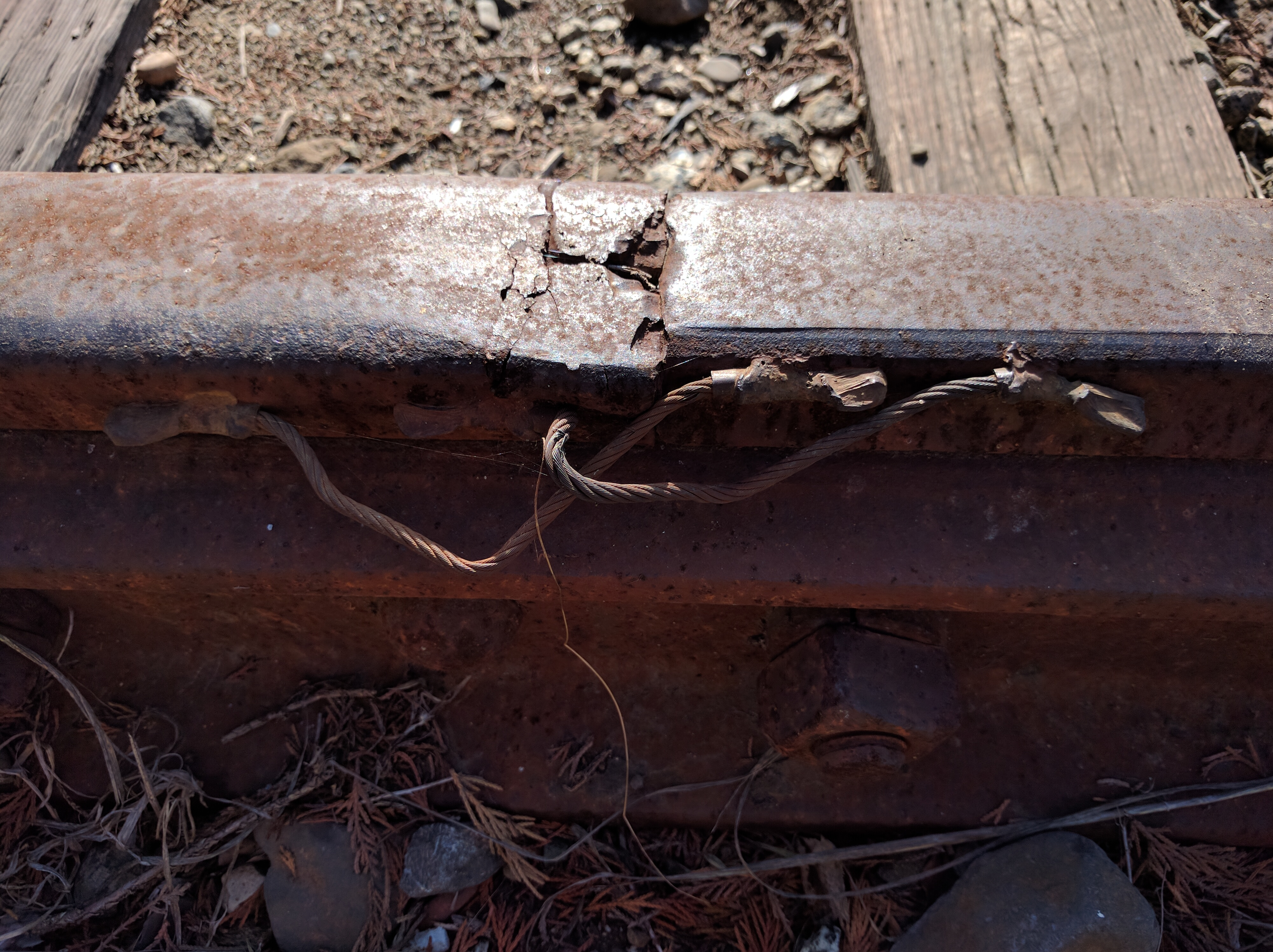
Damaged rail

Many factors influence rail defects and rail failure. These effects include bending and shear stresses, wheel/rail contact stresses, thermal stresses, residual stresses, and dynamic effects.

Defects due to contact stresses or rolling contact fatigue (RCF):

- tongue lipping
- head checking (gauge corner cracking)
- squats - which start as small surface-breaking cracks

Other forms of surface and internal defects:

- corrosion
- inclusions
- seams
- shelling
- transverse fissures
- wheel burn

One effect that can cause crack propagation is the presence of water and other liquids. When fluid fills a small crack, and a train passes over, the water becomes trapped in the void and can expand the crack tip. Also, the trapped fluid could freeze and expand, or initiate corrosion.

Parts of a rail where defects can be found:

- head
- web
- foot
- switchblades
- welds
- bolt holes

A majority of the flaws found in rails are located in the head; however, flaws are also found in the web and foot. This means that the entire rail needs to be inspected.

== NDT methods ==
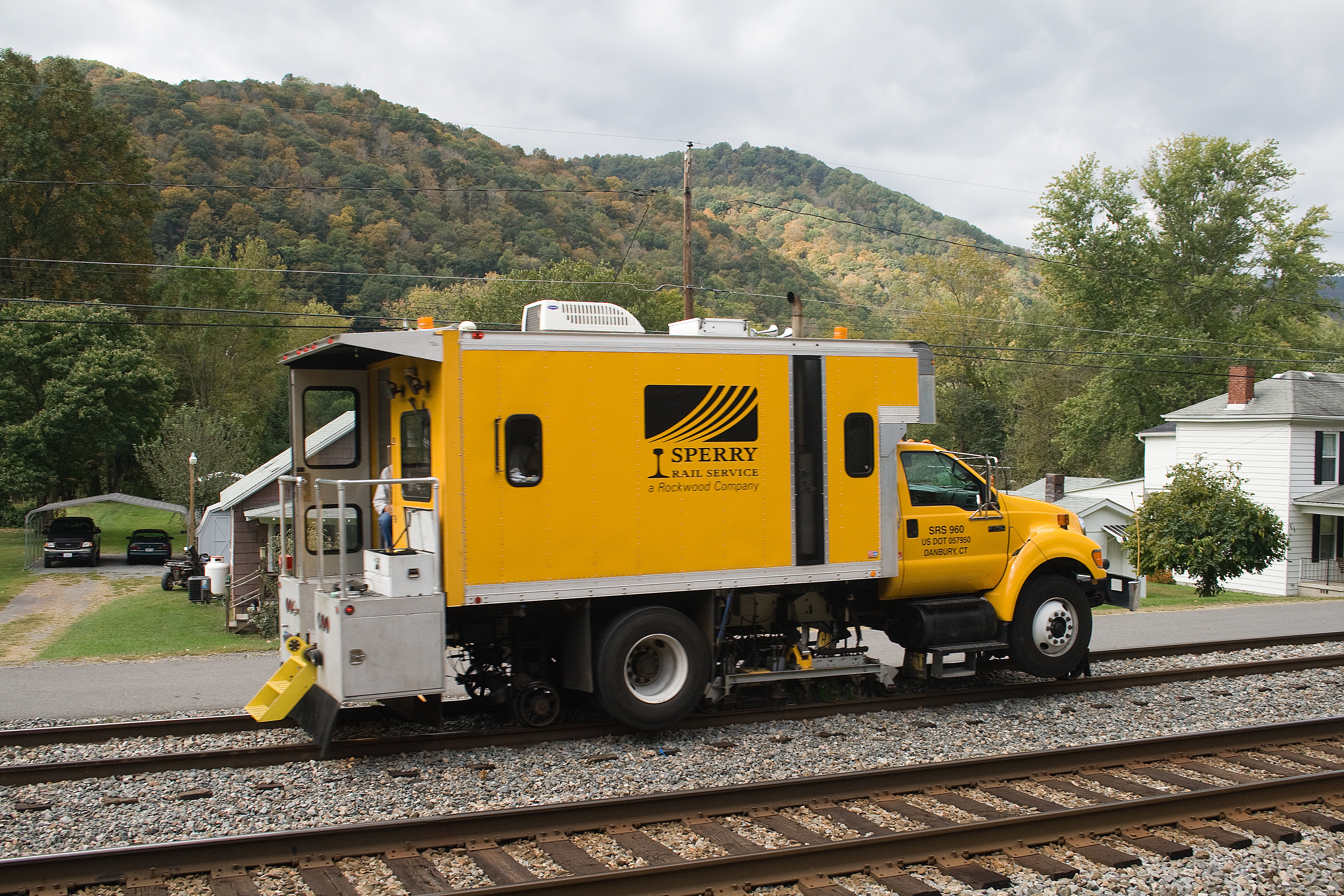
A Sperry Rail Service HiRail Truck equipped with Magnetic Induction and Ultrasonic Inspection.

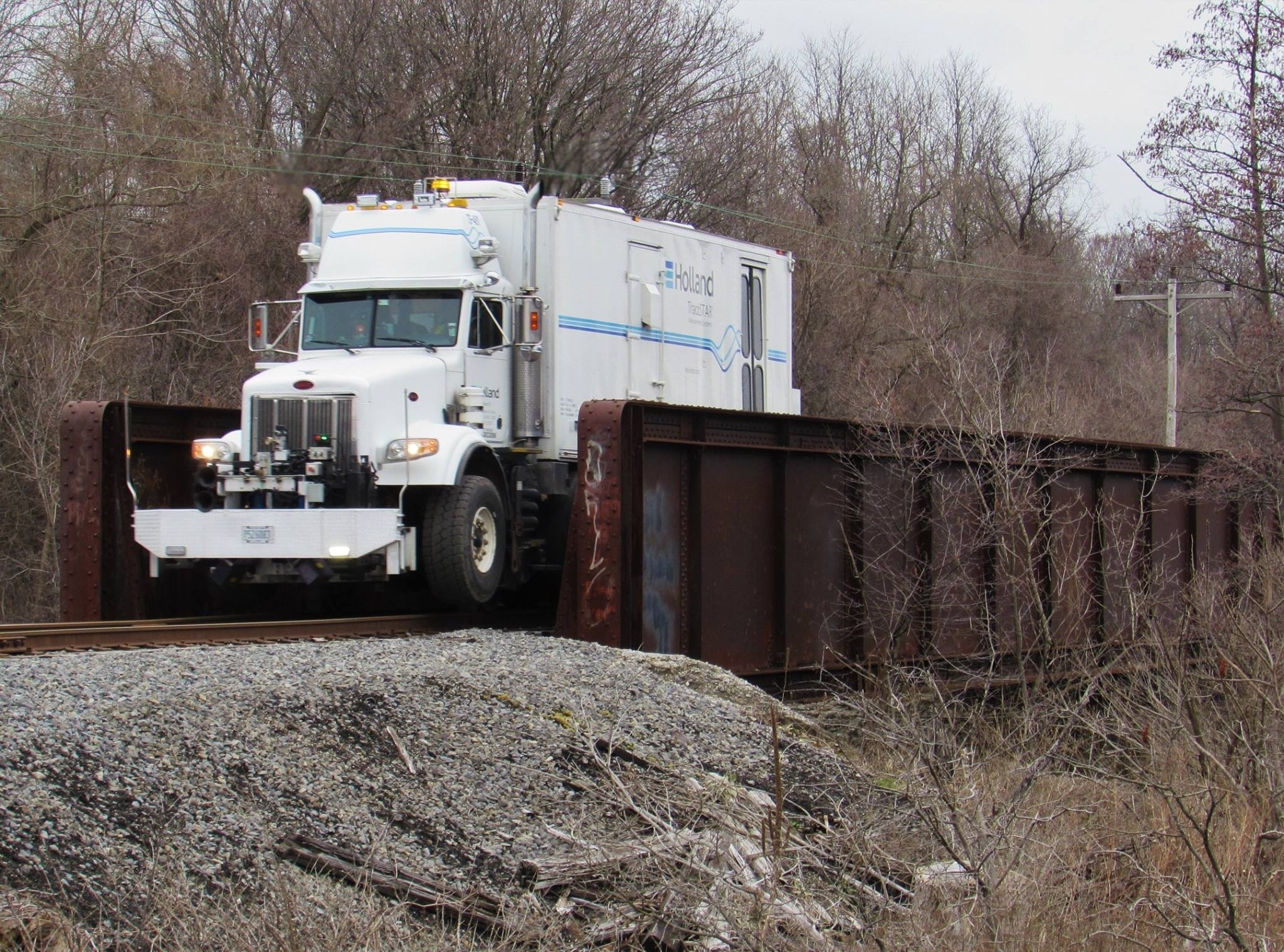
Holland Trackstar HiRail measurement vehicle in operation testing rail geometry, strength, and profile

A list of methods used to detect flaws in rails:

- Ultrasound - the most popular method
- Visual Inspection - Primarily using cameras to detect broken or cracked joint bars in bolted rail.
- Liquid Penetrant Inspection (LPI) - used for manual inspection of joint bars and rail ends.
- Eddy current inspection - great for surface flaws & near-surface flaws
- Magnetic Particle Inspection (MPI) - used for detailed manual inspection
- Radiography - used on specific locations (often predetermined) such as bolt holes and where thermite welding was used
- Magnetic induction or Magnetic flux leakage - the earliest method used to locate unseen flaws in the railway industry
- EMAT Electromagnetic Acoustic Transducer

== Utilizing NDT methods ==
The techniques mentioned above are utilized in a handful of different ways. The probes and transducers can be used on a "walking stick", on a hand-pushed trolley, or in a handheld setup. These devices are used when small sections of track are to be inspected or when a precise location is desired. Often, these detail-oriented inspection devices follow up on indications from rail inspection cars or rail trucks. Handheld inspection devices are very useful for this when the track is heavily used, as they can be removed relatively easily. However, they are considered very slow and tedious when inspecting thousands of miles of track.

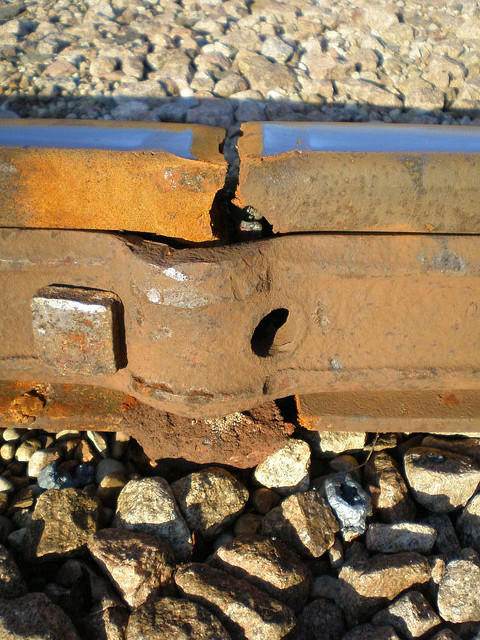

Rail inspection cars and HiRail trucks are the answer to today's high mileage inspection needs. Dr. Sperry created the first rail inspection cars. Since then, many new models have rolled out. These rail inspection cars are basically their own train with inspection equipment on board. The probes and transducers are mounted on carriages located underneath the inspection car. Modern-day inspection cars now use multiple NDT methods. Induction and ultrasound methods can be used in rail inspection cars and operate at testing speeds of more than 30 mph (48 km/h). Increased Camera systems for the detection of broken joint bars or missing bolts. Eddy Current systems for the detection of near-surface defects.

There are many manufacturers of road/rail inspection trucks, otherwise known as HiRail trucks. These HiRail inspection cars are almost all equipped exclusively for ultrasonic testing, but some can perform multiple tests. These trucks are loaded with high-speed computers using advanced programs that recognize patterns and contain classification information. The trucks are also equipped with storage space, tool cabinets, and workbenches. A GPS unit is used with the computer to mark new defects and locate previously marked defects. The Federal Railroad Administration (FRA) requires that any indications of defects be hand-verified immediately. The GPS allows a follow-up car to pinpoint exactly where the lead vehicle detected the flaw. One advantage of the HiRail trucks is that they can work around regular rail traffic without shutting down or slowing down entire stretches of track. However, because railroad management frequently orders HiRail trucks to be used to inspect tracks at speeds over 50 mph (80 km/h), tracks reported as having been inspected are, in fact, not inspected. An NTSB report on the 2006 Amtrak derailment in Oregon documented this fact.

== The future of rail inspection ==
With increased rail traffic carrying heavier loads at higher speeds, a faster, more efficient way to inspect railways is needed. Lasers inspect railway geometry, but one day they might be used for non-contact evaluation of the rail. This will most likely be done using laser-optical transmitting transducers in ultrasonic testing. Eliminating contact with the rail could one day allow high-speed detection of flaws. (Testing of rail is currently able to be done at 80 km per hour with a Speno US-6 Ultrasonics train) Another need for the future is a complete rail inspection system. A step in this direction is a deeper investigation of the rail by using low-frequency eddy currents. Other advancements could include neural network-based signal analysis to improve defect detection and identification, as well as longitudinal guided ultrasonics. Improved rail quality, composition, and joining techniques could lead to better wear characteristics and a longer rail lifespan. Some investigation into banitic steels looks promising. A safe, portable means of filmless radiography could assist with on-site defect evaluation. These are just a few advancements in development for future use.

A Network Rail inspection train at Scarborough railway station, United Kingdom

== Example trains ==
- Doctor Yellow (Japan)
- New Measurement Train (United Kingdom)

== See also ==
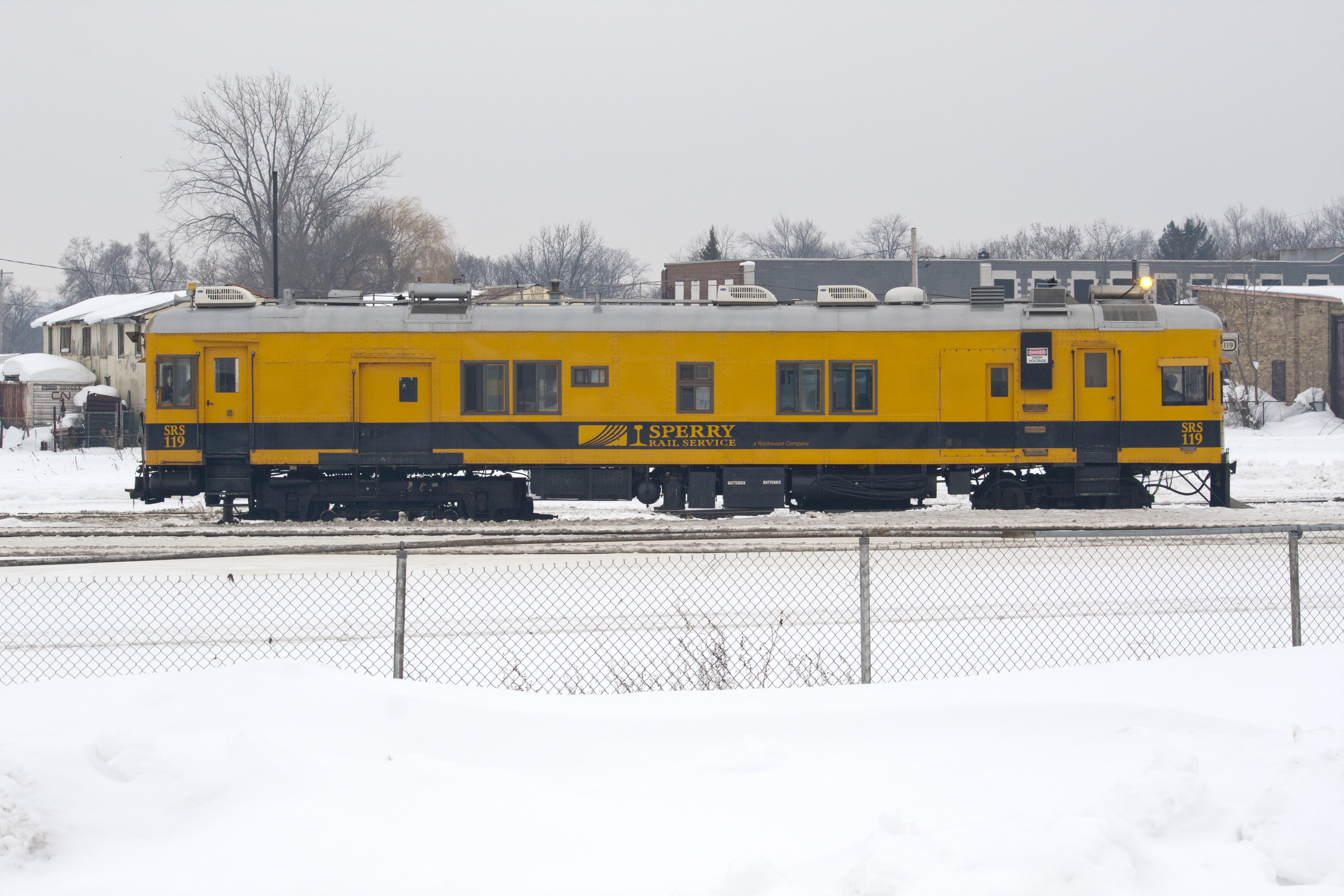
An upgraded Sperry Rail Service rail bound car as seen in 2010.

- Maintenance of way
- Nondestructive testing
- Rail tracks
- Work train
- Track checker
- Track geometry car
