= Hermann Anschütz-Kaempfe =

German scientist and inventor

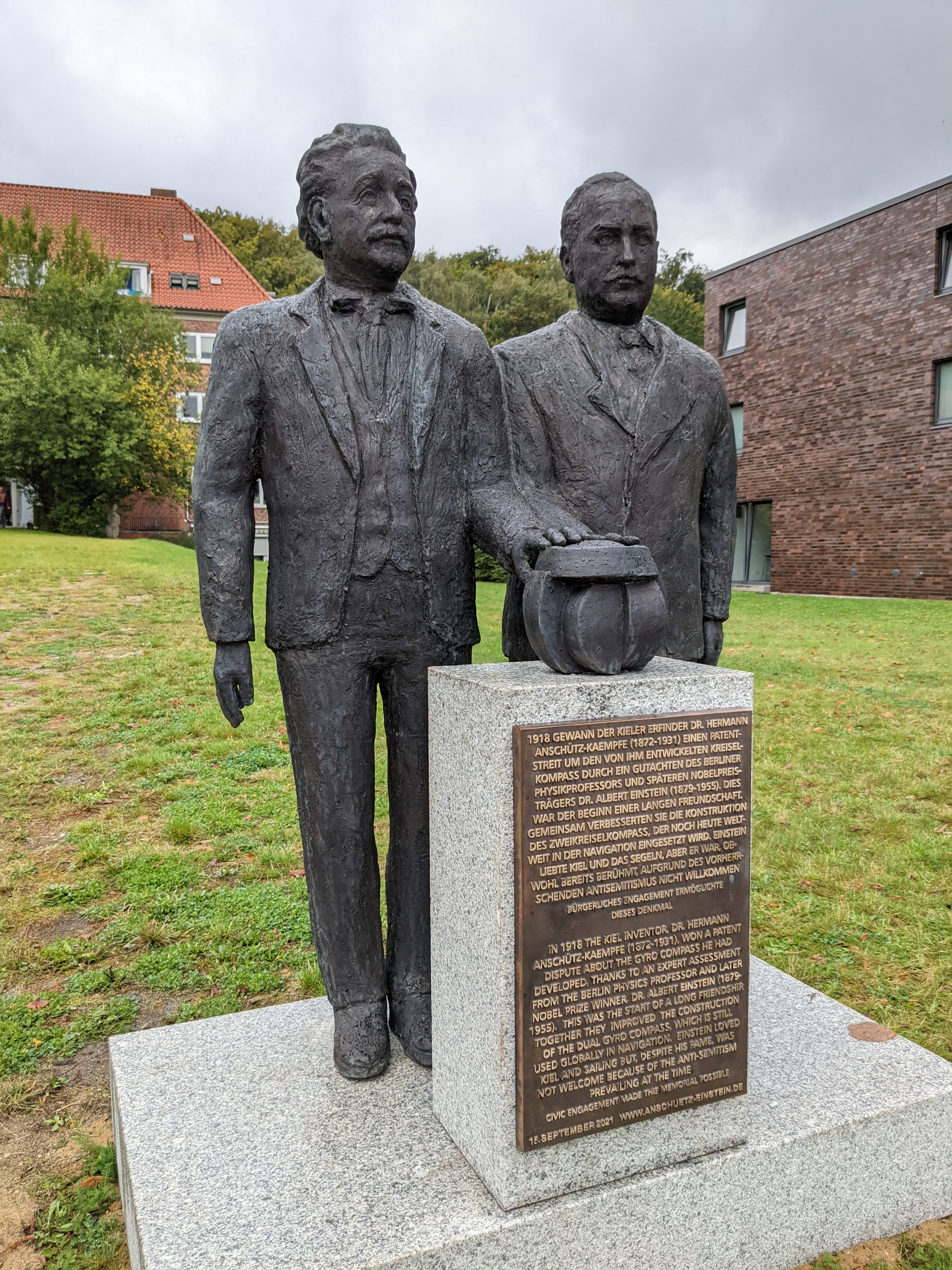
- Memorial of Albert Einstein (left) and Hermann Anschütz-Kaempfe (right) holding a gyrocompass
- Born: Hermann Franz Joseph Hubertus Maria Anschütz-Kaempfe; 3 October 1872; Zweibrücken, Bavaria, Germany
- Died: 6 May 1931 (aged 58); Munich, Bavaria, Germany
- Occupations: Art historian, inventor

Hermann Franz Joseph Hubertus Maria Anschütz-Kaempfe (3 October 1872 – 6 May 1931) was a German art historian and inventor. He was born in Zweibrücken and died in Munich.

In his quest to navigate to the North Pole by submarine, he became interested in the concept of the gyrocompass. In 1905 he founded, with Friedrich Treitschke, the company Anschütz & Co (today Anschütz GmbH) in Kiel, Germany. Anschütz was the first firm to manufacture gyroscopic navigation instruments, which Anschütz-Kaempfe designed. One of his staff was Maximilian Schuler, who made the fundamental discovery of Schuler tuning.

== See also ==
- Elmer Ambrose Sperry
