= Sperry Rail Service =

U.S. railroad inspection company

- Founded: 1928
- Founder: Elmer Sperry
- Headquarters: Shelton, Connecticut, United States
- Area served: Worldwide
- Services: Rail Inspection
- Website: www.sperryrail.com

Sperry Rail Service (reporting mark SRSX) is a rail inspection company founded in 1928 by Elmer Ambrose Sperry. The company was the first in the world to offer nondestructive testing of railroad tracks. Since its formation, Sperry has been contracted by most of the major railroads in North America to inspect rail. To accomplish this task, the company operates a fleet of rail service vehicles that travel along railroads to detect defects.

While most prominent in North America, Sperry also operates in South America, Europe, Asia, Africa, and Australia.

== History ==
=== Development of Defect Detection ===
By the late 19th century, train derailments, some of which were blamed on transverse fissures, were increasing. One of them occurred in 1911, in Manchester, New York, killing 29 and seriously injuring 60. Another killed 21 and injured over 100 near Victoria, Mississippi, in October 1925.

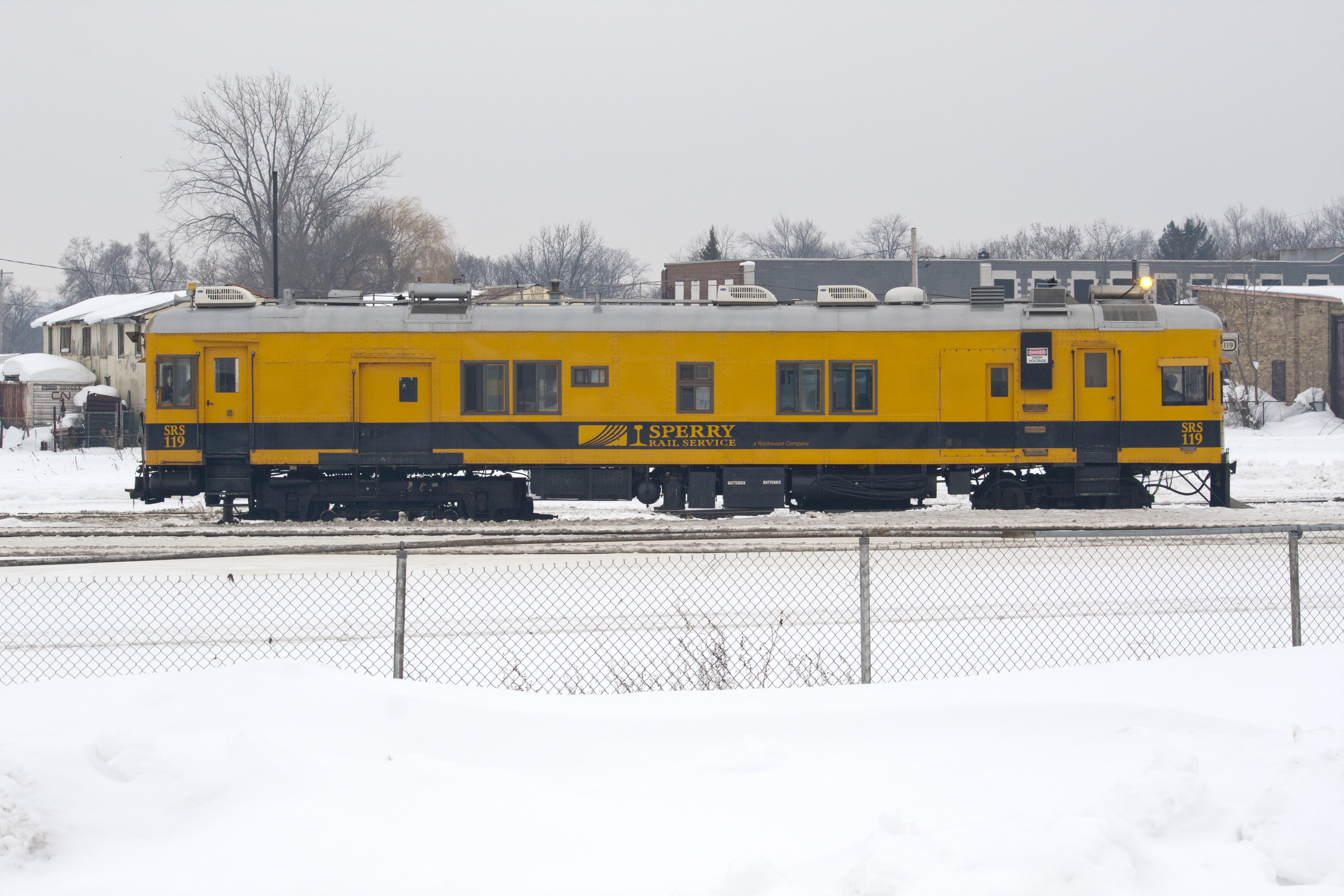
Sperry Rail Service Vehicle

Dr. Elmer Sperry began developing a method of locating internal rail defects in 1911. To build a railway test car, he contracted the American Railway Association in 1927. Construction on this first car began in June 1927. The body was metal-faced plywood, and was mounted on a Kalamazoo motor car bed. This car was towed by a larger motor car. After completion, it was delivered on December 17, 1927, for performing tests.

An operator, lying flat on his stomach as he was moved along on a hand car, held a "search unit" against the rail. Both fissures were found, but serious difficulties were encountered during the test. This method also posed problems due to uneven rail surfaces.

=== Detection Methods ===
Sperry and his staff discovered a new principle for detecting transverse fissures in 1928, called the "induction method." It also found split-heads and other invisible defects. While a major advancement, this method had its limitations. It did not function properly at the end of each rail where angle bars and bolts held two succeeding rails together, or where two rails converged such as at switch points. These rail parts had to be examined individually by a hand-held ultrasonic scanner.

The induction system was augmented by mobile semi-automated ultrasonic inspection equipment in 1960. Today, Sperry performs both induction testing and ultrasonic testing with its rail service vehicles.

=== Later redevelopments of 101 unit ===
It would appear that the induction-based testing method equipment replaced the original magnetic equipment on Sperry Rail Service 101. Even though it was completed almost ten months before, the car was rejected by the American Railway Association's Rail Committee until October 2, 1928. After a test run on September 27, 1928, by Dr. Sperry and his research engineer H.C. Drake, it began testing on the New York Central under ARA supervision. The test with the modified 101 was so successful that construction on SRS 102 began almost immediately.

=== Reorientation Towards Inspection Services ===
The original plan of Dr. Sperry was to build and sell the rail detector cars, along with the testing services, to the railways. However, the railways were reluctant, so Sperry decided to sell the rail inspection service only. It would lead to more consistent testing, which is done by skilled and experienced personnel.

- At this point, Sperry Rail Service Corporation was created to market the testing service. The first commercial test was accomplished in November 1928, on the Wabash Railway over a 130-mile (210 km) section of track between Montpelier, Ohio, and Clarke Junction, Indiana performed by SRS 102. The expansion of service put two more SRS cars into operation. In the early 1930s, four cars were in service. By the end of the 1930s, Sperry Rail Service Corporation's fleet increased to ten cars.
- The fleet continued to expand along with the served area. In addition to services on U.S. railroads, the SRS cars also traveled to Canada, Mexico, and overseas. Smaller railways could not afford their own rail detector car, with their limited use. However, the New York Central and the Union Pacific did own such rail detection cars. Many Sperry cars were created by rebuilding existing railway cars, particularly doodlebugs.

More information about the types of defects that can be found by the Sperry rail car is detailed in this document.

=== Acquisition of Harsco Track Technologies ===
On August 29, 2002, Sperry Rail Service acquired Harsco Corporation's rail flaw detection (RFD) group. Harsco's track maintenance division, also known as Harsco Track Technologies (HTT), was located in Danbury, Connecticut, Sperry's hometown. With this takeover, Sperry's rail flaw detection fleet increased by 30 trucks. Harsco's Rail Flaw Service was previously known as Pandrol Jackson Technologies.
