= Anschütz GmbH =

German navigation instrument company

- Founded: 1905 in Kiel, Germany
- Founder: Hermann Anschütz-Kaempfe
- Products: Navigation systems
- Website: www.anschuetz.com

Anschütz GmbH, known as Raytheon Anschütz from 1995 to 2023, is a company that produces marine navigation systems and related instruments. It was originally formed as Anschütz & Company in 1905 in Kiel, Germany, in order to produce the first gyrocompass for large ships, which entered service in 1907. The company expanded to produce autopilots and new forms of compasses. The original company was broken up at the end of World War II.

The company reformed in 1952, expanding their autopilot line and introducing computerized systems in the 1970s and full modular bridge systems in 1995. The same year, the company was purchased by Raytheon who purchased several other European nautical companies and began to centralize manufacturing at Anschütz's Kiel factories. This included radar systems from Sweden's Standard Radio.

In 2023, German-based DMB Dr. Dieter Murmann Beteiligungsgesellschaft mbH acquired Anschütz and the company was renamed to Anschütz GmbH. The company is a manufacturer and an integrator of navigation systems, bridge systems and mission systems for ships, including gyro compasses, steering gear control systems and autopilots, electronic chart display and information systems (ECDIS), radars, and electronic logbooks.

== History ==
=== Inspiration ===
In 1898, Dr. Hermann Anschütz-Kaempfe attempted to navigate from Germany to the United States under the polar ice cap in a submarine. This attempt failed for a variety of reasons, one being that the magnetic compass became increasingly inaccurate as one approached the polar regions, especially when used from a steel ship. This inspired Anschütz-Kaempfe to solve the compass problem.

In 1903, Anschütz-Kaempfe introduced the world's first usable gyrocompasses. The gyrocompass does not rely on the Earth's magnetic field, instead, it is powered by the Earth's rotation and its effects on other spinning objects. This allows it to accurately measure the north direction regardless of location or any external magnetic effects. Similar concepts had been developed by Marinus Gerardus van den Bos and Barend Janse in 1885, but not used commercially. In 1904, his version was fit to the light cruiser SMS Undine and with this initial success, he filed for a German patent on 27 March 1904 and followed this with a British filing the next year.

In 1905, Anschütz formed Anschütz and Co. in Kiel with help from the German Navy, with co-partners Lieutenant Friedrich von Schirach and Friedrich Treitschke. In 1906, Max Schuler, Anschütz's cousin, joined the firm and developed a new mathematical theory today known as Schuler tuning to keep the gyro properly aligned with the surface of the earth. The first production-quality model, completed in 1907, used two gimbals to allow the gyro to spin in X and Y, and was levelled to the surface by floating the assembly in mercury. It was tested on the battleship SMS Deutschland in March 1908, which demonstrated its tendency to tumble in high sea states. This led to the introduction of a three-gyro system to address this problem, while the existing two-gyro version was accepted for service in the meantime. The three-gyro system was first completed in 1910 and entered service in 1912. It equipped most of the German fleet by the opening of World War I in 1914.

=== Lawsuit ===
During this period, Elmer Ambrose Sperry developed a similar device and received patents for it in England in 1908 and in the US the next year. In May 1914, Sperry sold a model to the German Navy, which Anschütz heard about and decided to sue Sperry for patent infringement. During an initial hearing in Berlin in 1914, Sperry argued that Anschütz's patent was invalid as it contained no real changes from the original van den Bos version, whose patent had since expired. Anschütz pointed to the damping method in their own patent which they claimed had been copied exactly in Sperry's devices.

The court, realizing this was a highly technical manner, suggested that a suitable expert in both the technical matters and patent law agreeable to both parties be brought in to pass judgement. On 5 January 1915, Albert Einstein was paid 1,000 Marks to appear before the court and answer a series of technical questions, followed by a written report filed 6 February. He concluded that both were correct: the initial Anschütz patent seemed too vague to conclude it was an improvement on the earlier patent, but also agreed that Sperry's damping system did infringe on Anschütz's design.

At a follow-up meeting on 26 March, Anschütz asked Einstein to personally inspect the Sperry device, which was carried out on 10 July and resulted in a second report 7 August. This concluded that the stabilization system in the Anschütz patent did indeed represent a true advance over the original van den Bos patent, and reiterated his conclusion that the Sperry system was substantially the same. On 16 November 1915 the court concluded in favour of Anschütz, issuing a 300,000 Mark fine to Sperry and forbidding him from selling devices using any concepts from the Anschütz patent. Sperry ignored both findings and made widespread sales to the allied forces.

=== Inter-war and WWII ===
In 1920, the company introduced the first autopilot for ships, the "Iron Helmsman". In 1925 they began work on a gyrocompass system, in partnership with Albert Einstein, which used two spheres instead of traditional gyroscopes and gimbals. In 1930, Anschütz-Kaempfe sold most of his shares to Carl Zeiss. The company remained a supplier to the German Navy and merchant fleets until 1945, when its factory was dismantled at the end of the war.

=== Re-formation ===
The company was re-founded in 1952. From this point, they concentrated mainly on the commercial fleet. They introduced their first electromechanical autopilot in 1956, and first fully electrical model in 1969. In 1974 they introduced their first computerized course tracking system. In 1976, they were part of the merger of several companies that formed Zeiss Ikon. Through the 1980s and 90s the company increasingly computerized its offerings.

In 1995 they were purchased by Raytheon, who already marketed a large variety of marine-related gear, notably their radar systems. The company remained semi-independent, and over time Raytheon used their Kiel locations to concentrate their other European holdings.

In 2023 DMB acquired the company and the company was renamed to Anschütz GmbH. The company has subsidiaries in Panama City, Portsmouth (United Kingdom), Rio de Janeiro, Shanghai and Singapore.
