= Max Schuler =

German engineer (1882–1972)

Maximilian Joseph Johannes Eduard Schuler (5 February 1882 in Zweibrücken – 30 July 1972) was a German engineer and is best known for discovering the principle known as Schuler tuning which is fundamental to the operation of a gyrocompass or inertial guidance system that will be operated near the surface of the Earth.

Schuler's cousin Hermann Anschütz-Kaempfe founded a firm near Kiel, Germany, to manufacture navigational devices using gyroscopes in 1905, and Schuler joined the firm in 1906. For many years they struggled with the problem of maintaining a vertical reference as a craft moved around on the surface of the Earth.

In 1923 Schuler published his discovery that if the gyrocompass was tuned to have an 84.4 minute period of oscillation (the Schuler period) then it would resist errors due to sideways acceleration of the ship or aircraft in which it was installed.

Later, Schuler served as a professor of dynamics at the University of Göttingen. According to the Mathematics Genealogy Project he supervised one dissertation there, that of Kurt Magnus (whose other supervisor was Ludwig Prandtl).
