= Elmer Ambrose Sperry =

American industrialist (1860–1930)

Elmer Ambrose Sperry Sr.
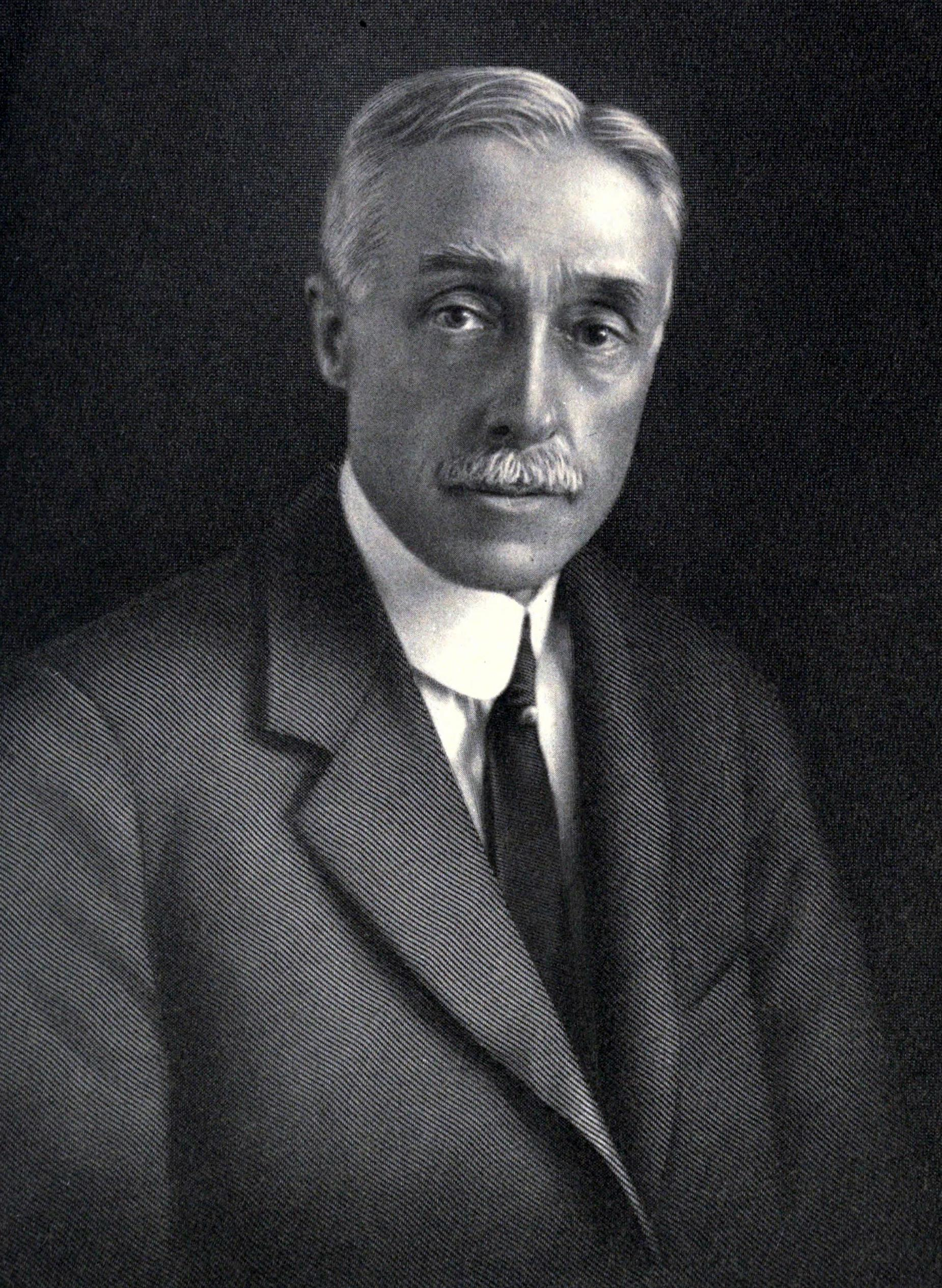
- Born: October 12, 1860; Cincinnatus, New York
- Died: June 16, 1930 (aged 69); Brooklyn, New York
- Education: Cornell University
- Known for: gyroscopic compasses
- Spouse: Zula Augusta Goodman (1860–1929) (m. 1887–1929)
- Children: Helen M. Sperry (1889–Oct 1977); Edward Goodman Sperry (1890–1945); Lawrence Burst Sperry (1892–1923); Elmer Ambrose Sperry, Jr. (1894–1968)
- Parent(s): Stephen Decatur Sperry (1825–1889); Mary Burst (1839–1860)
- Awards: John Fritz Medal (1927); Elliott Cresson Medal (1929)

Signature
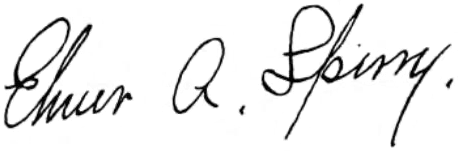

Elmer Ambrose Sperry Sr. (October 12, 1860 – June 16, 1930) was an American inventor and entrepreneur, most famous for construction, two years after Hermann Anschütz-Kaempfe, of the gyrocompass and as founder of the Sperry Gyroscope Company. He was known as the "father of modern navigation technology".

Sperry's compasses and stabilizers were adopted by the United States Navy and used in both world wars. He also worked closely with Japanese companies and the Japanese government and was honored after his death with a volume of reminiscences published in Japan.

== Early life ==
Sperry was born in Cincinnatus, New York, on October 12, 1860, to Stephen Decatur Sperry and Mary Burst. His mother died the next day, from complications from his birth.

He was of English ancestry. His family had been in what is now the Northeastern United States since the 1600s, and his earliest American ancestor was an English colonist named Richard Sperry (born 1606).

Sperry spent three years at the State Normal School in Cortland, New York, then a year at Cornell University in 1878 and 1879, where he became interested in dynamos. He moved to Chicago, Illinois, early in 1880 and soon after founded the Sperry Electric Company. He married Zula Augusta Goodman (1860-1929) in Chicago, Illinois on June 28, 1887.

== Career ==
=== Early inventions ===
In 1887, Sperry created a system to bring electricity into coal mines, heating the copper wires to prevent corrosion. This system allowed him to bring self-designed mining equipment deep below the surface, to greatly increase the production of coal. In 1888 the Sperry Electric Machinery Mining Company was founded.

In 1890, Sperry formed the Sperry Electric Railway Company. Here he used ideas from the electric trains sold by his mining company to create electric trolleys in large, hilly cities in Ohio and Pennsylvania. While working with this company, Sperry designed an electric automobile, which led to Sperry patenting ideas that would be later used in the development of portable lead acid batteries. In 1896, he drove his car in Paris, making it the first American-made car in Paris. In 1894, General Electric bought the railway company and its associated patents.

In 1900 Sperry established an electrochemical laboratory at Washington, D.C., where he and his associate, Clifton P. Townshend, developed a process for making pure caustic soda and discovered a process for recovering tin from scrap metal.

=== Work with gyroscopes ===
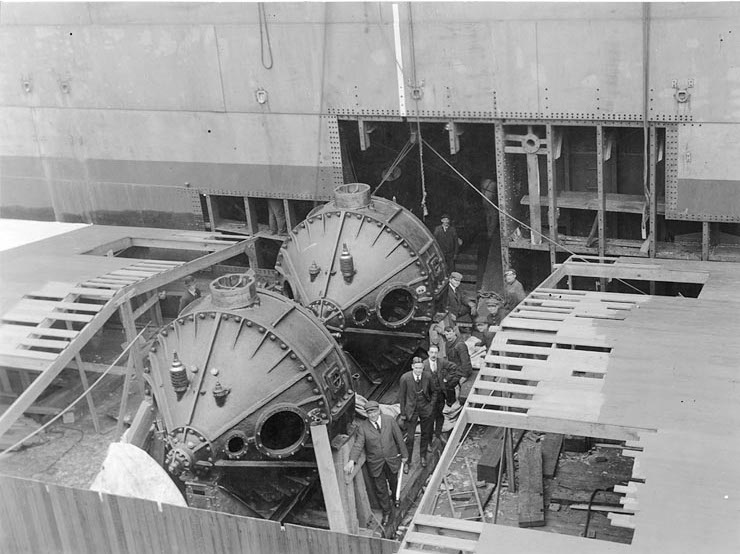
Sperry's stabilizing gyroscope installed in the USS Henderson

After experiencing seasickness on an Atlantic voyage in 1898, Sperry started to work on incorporating a large gyroscope into a ship to lessen the effect of waves on the ship. His gyroscope-stabilized ship differed from others at the time by having a sensor built in to the system to detect the first signs of a wave that the system would have to work to mitigate. In 1911, Sperry worked with the US Navy to incorporate his gyroscopic stabilizer, which greatly reduced major roll of the ship, into Navy ships. While effective, Sperry's gyrostabilizer never was widely sold because of its expense, both in installation and maintenance.

Sperry found another use for his gyroscopes in 1908. Magnetic compasses on steel battleships at the time had issues with maintaining magnetic north with the variations of the magnetic field they experienced. Working with Hannibal C. Ford, Sperry began work on a gyrocompass to replace the magnetic compass. In 1910 he founded the Sperry Gyroscope Company in Brooklyn, New York on the basis of this innovation. His first navigational gyroscope was tested that same year in USS Delaware (BB-28). After successful tests, Sperry's gyrocompass was soon being installed on American, British, French, Italian, and Russian naval crafts. During World War I, the importance of the gyrocompass increased as the compass was adapted to control the steering of a ship to automatically hold a steady line.

=== Aircraft improvements ===
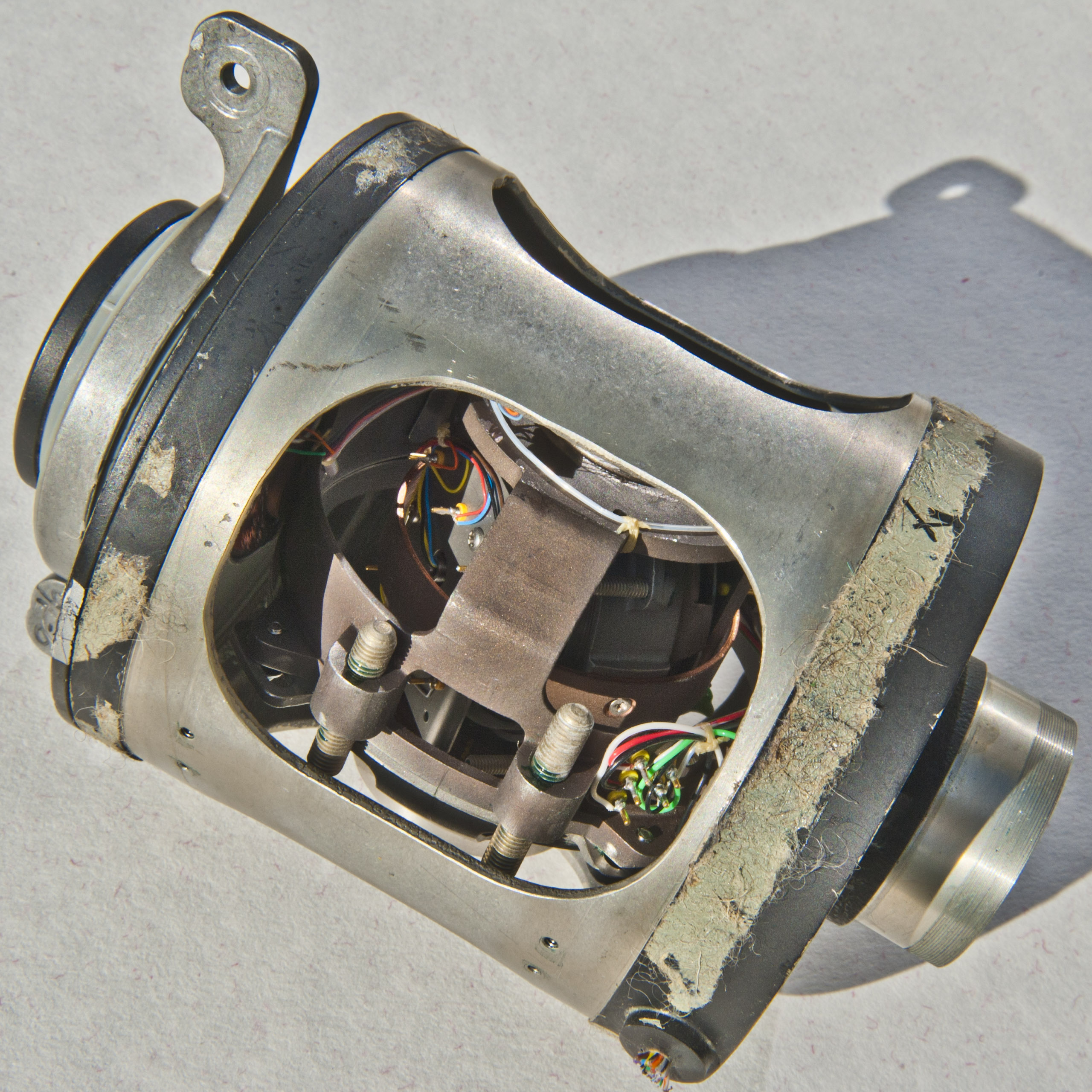
Aircraft gyrocompass built by Sperry

In 1913, working with his son Lawrence Burst Sperry, Sperry created a gyro that could control the elevators and ailerons of an aircraft through a series of servomechanisms. Sperry successfully implemented his gyrostabilizer technology, formerly thought to be only applicable to large ships, because of their high weight, into aircraft. In June 1914, Sperry and his son won the Aero Club of France's competition to build a safer aircraft, demonstrating the stabilizer with his son doing a "no-hands" flight past the judges. He also was awarded a Franklin Institute Medal in the same year. This gyrostabilization system, while never implemented on a massive scale, laid the foundation for his son's autopilot system.

In 1916, Sperry joined Peter Hewitt to develop the Hewitt-Sperry Automatic Airplane, one of the first successful precursors of the UAV.

In 1917, Sperry solved the issue of magnetic compasses indicating the opposite position when an aircraft is turning, inventing the Gyro Turn Indicator. This turn indicator was later modified into what is known now as the Turn and Slip Indicator. With a Directional Gyro and Gyro Horizon added later, Sperry created a core of flight instruments that became standard equipment on all aircraft.

During both world wars, Sperry's company profited from military demand for gyroscopes. His technology was subsequently used in torpedoes, ships, airplanes, and spacecraft. Sperry moved into related devices such as bombsights, fire control, radar, and automated take off and landing. During World War I he worked to create a "flying bomb", and on March 6, 1918, he guided an aerial torpedo for more than half a mile using radio control.

=== Naval turret improvements ===
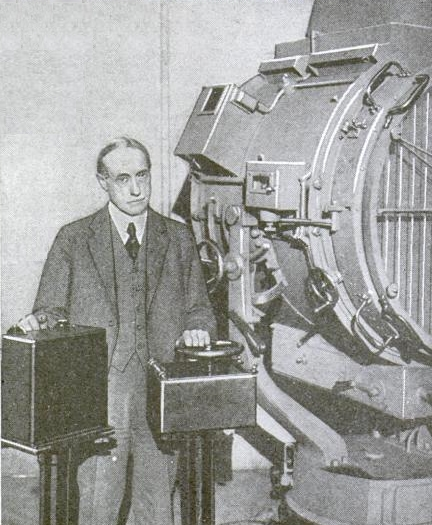
Elmer Ambrose Sperry demonstrating the operation of a searchlight

Working with the US Navy, Sperry developed a system to control the entire battery of a battleship from an interior room of the ship. This control system used his gyroscopic equipment to correct an individual gun's position based on changes in course of the ship, allowing the entire battery to remain focused on one point. This control system was installed on all battleships of the United States Navy during World War I.

Sperry was a founding member of the U.S. Naval Consulting Board, 1915.

Starting in 1914, Sperry began working with the US Navy to develop higher-power lighting for use with naval turrets. Out of this partnership, Sperry and his team created a new kind of arc lamp that heated a gas to incandescence, creating a source of light five times brighter than other continuous light sources of the time. In 1918 he produced a high-intensity arc lamp which was used as a searchlight by both the Army and Navy.

== Late life and death ==
In 1923, Sperry's son Lawrence died in the English Channel in the crash of an airplane of his own design. In January 1929, Sperry sold his Sperry Gyroscope Company to North American Aviation. The following year his wife died, on March 31, in Havana, Cuba.

Sperry died at St. John Hospital in Brooklyn, New York, on June 16, 1930, from complications following the removal of gallstones six weeks earlier. He was 69 years old.

== Memberships ==
Sperry was a member of the following groups:

- Founder and charter member of the American Institute of Electrical Engineers
- Founder and charter member of the American Electro-Chemical Society
- American Association for the Advancement of Science
- American Physical Society
- American Society of Mechanical Engineers
- Society of Naval Architects and Marine Engineers
- New York Electrical Society
- American Petroleum Institute
- Edison Pioneers
- National Aeronautical Association
- Aero Club of America
- Engineers' Club
- National Electric Light Association
- Franklin Institute
- Japan Society
- National Academy of Sciences
- Director of the Museum of the Peaceful Arts

== Awards ==
- Aero Club of France (1914) for his airplane stabilizer
- Franklin Institute Medal (1914, specific award unknown) for his gyroscopic compass
- Collier Trophy (1914) for gyroscopic control
- Collier Trophy (1916) for his drift indicator
- Holley Medal (1928)
- John Fritz Medal (1927)
- Albert Gary Medal (1927)
- Elliott Cresson Medal (1929) for gyroscopic navigational and recording instruments
- Two decorations from the last Czar of Russia; two decorations from the Emperor of Japan, the Order of the Rising Sun and the Order of the Sacred Treasure; and the grand prize of the Panama Exposition.
- National Aviation Hall of Fame (1973)

== Companies ==
- Sperry Electric Mining Machine Company, (1888)
- Sperry Electric Railway Company, (1894)
- Chicago Fuse Wire Company, (1900)
- Sperry Rail Service (1911) a rail defect detection company
- Sperry Gyroscope Company (1910), founded to manufacture Sperry's development of the gyrocompass, originally invented by Hermann Anschütz-Kaempfe in 1908. Sperry's first model was installed on the battleship USS Delaware in 1911

== Legacy ==
- The Elmer A. Sperry Award, which encourages progress in transportation-related engineering, is named for him
- USS Sperry (AS-12), a submarine tender, was named for him
- The Sperry Center at SUNY Cortland in Cortland, NY is named after him
