= Schuler tuning =

Inertial navigation design principle

Schuler tuning is a design principle for inertial navigation systems that accounts for the curvature of the Earth. An inertial navigation system, used in submarines, ships, aircraft, and other vehicles to keep track of position, determines directions with respect to three axes pointing "north", "east", and "down". To detect the vehicle's orientation, the system contains an "inertial platform" mounted on gimbals, with gyroscopes that detect motion connected to a servo system to keep it pointing in a fixed orientation in space. However, the directions "north", "east" and "down" change as the vehicle moves on the curved surface of the Earth. Schuler tuning describes the conditions necessary for an inertial navigation system to keep the inertial platform always pointing "north", "east" and "down", so it gives correct directions on the near-spherical Earth. It is widely used in electronic control systems.

== Principle ==
As first explained by German engineer Maximilian Schuler in a 1923 paper, a pendulum that has a period that equals the orbital period of a hypothetical satellite orbiting at the surface of Earth (about 84.4 minutes) will tend to remain pointing at the center of Earth when its support is suddenly displaced. Such a pendulum (sometimes called a Schuler pendulum) would have a length equal to the radius of Earth. Consider a simple gravity pendulum, whose length to its center of gravity equals the radius of Earth, suspended in a uniform gravitational field of the same strength as that experienced at Earth's surface. If suspended from the surface of Earth, the center of gravity of the pendulum bob would be at the center of Earth. If it is hanging motionless and its support is moved sideways, the bob tends to remain motionless, so the pendulum always points at the center of Earth. If such a pendulum were attached to the inertial platform of an inertial navigation system, the platform would remain level, facing "north", "east" and "down", as it was moved about on the surface of the Earth.

The Schuler period can be derived from the classic formula for the period of a pendulum:
$$T = 2\pi \sqrt\frac{L}{g} \approx 2\pi \sqrt\frac{6\,371\,000~\text{m}}{9.81~\text{m}/\text{s}^2} \approx 5063 \ \text{seconds} \approx 84.4 \ \text{minutes},$$
where L is the mean radius of Earth, and g is the local acceleration of gravity.

== Application ==
A pendulum the length of the Earth's radius is impractical, so Schuler tuning doesn't use physical pendulums. Instead, the electronic control system of the inertial navigation system is modified to make the platform behave as if it were attached to a pendulum. The inertial platform is mounted on gimbals, and an electronic control system keeps it pointed in a constant direction with respect to the three axes. As the vehicle moves, the gyroscopes detect changes in orientation, and a feedback loop applies signals to torquers to rotate the platform on its gimbals to keep it pointed along the axes.

To implement Schuler tuning, the feedback loop is modified to tilt the platform as the vehicle moves in the north–south and east–west directions, to keep the platform facing "down". To do this, the torquers that rotate the platform are fed a signal proportional to the vehicle's north–south and east–west velocity. The turning rate of the torquers is equal to the velocity divided by the radius of Earth R:
$$\dot{\theta} = v/R,$$
so
$$\ddot{\theta} = a/R.$$

The acceleration a is a combination of the actual vehicle acceleration and the acceleration due to gravity acting on the tilting inertial platform. It can be measured by an accelerometer mounted fixed on the platform, in either the north–south or east–west direction, horizontally. So this equation can be seen as a version of the equation for a simple gravity pendulum with a length equal to the radius of Earth. The inertial platform acts as if it were attached to such a pendulum.

An inertial navigation system is tuned by letting it sit motionless for one Schuler period. If its coordinates deviate too much during the period or it does not return to its original coordinates at its end, it must be tuned to the correct coordinates.

Schuler's time constant appears in other contexts. Suppose a tunnel is dug from one end of the Earth to the other end straight through its center. A stone dropped in such a tunnel oscillates harmonically with Schuler's time constant. It can also be proved that the time is the same constant for a tunnel that is not through the center of Earth. Such a tunnel has to be an Earth-centered ellipse, the same shape as the path of the stone. These thought experiments (or rather the results of the corresponding calculations) rely on an assumption of uniform density throughout the Earth. Since the density is not actually uniform, the "true" periods would deviate from Schuler's time constant.
