= Marine radar =

Microwave band RADAR used in maritime applications

Animation of typical rotating S band marine radar antenna on ship. It radiates a narrow vertical fan-shaped beam of microwaves perpendicular to the long axis of the antenna, horizontally out to the horizon. With each rotation the beam scans the surrounding surface. Any ships or obstructions reflect microwaves back to the antenna, displaying on the radar screen.

Marine radars are X band or S band radars on ships, used to detect other ships and land hazards, to provide bearing and distance for collision avoidance and navigation at sea. They are electronic navigation instruments that use a rotating antenna to sweep a narrow beam of microwaves around the water surface surrounding the ship to the horizon, detecting targets by microwaves reflected from them, generating a picture of the ship's surroundings on a display. The X-Band and S-Band radar has different characteristics and detection capabilities compared with each other. Most merchant ships carry at least one of each type to ensure adequate target detection and response. For example, the S-band operates better in sea clutter and rain than the X-band, however, the X-band has greater definition and accuracy in clear weather.

Radar is a vital navigation component for safety at sea and near the shore. It allows a 'lookout' to be maintained, being one of the approved available means for compliance with Rule 5, keeping a proper lookout under the International Regulations for Preventing Collisions at Sea. Captains and the bridge teams of ships need to be able to maneuver their ships in close proximity to navigational hazards in the worst of conditions. These include a need to navigate "blind", when there is poor or no visibility at night or due to bad weather such as fog. In addition to vessel-based marine radars, in port or in harbour, shore-based vessel traffic service radar systems are used by harbormasters and coast guard to monitor and regulate ship movements in busy waters.

== Collision avoidance ==
As required by COLREGS, all ships shall maintain a proper radar lookout if it is available on board to obtain early warning of risk of collision. Radar plotting with the use of an EBL and VRM, or the ARPA should be used to determine the information of movement and the risk collision of other ships in vicinity. Information given to the user includes bearing, distance, CPA (closest point of approach) and TCPA (time of closest point of approach).

== Navigation ==
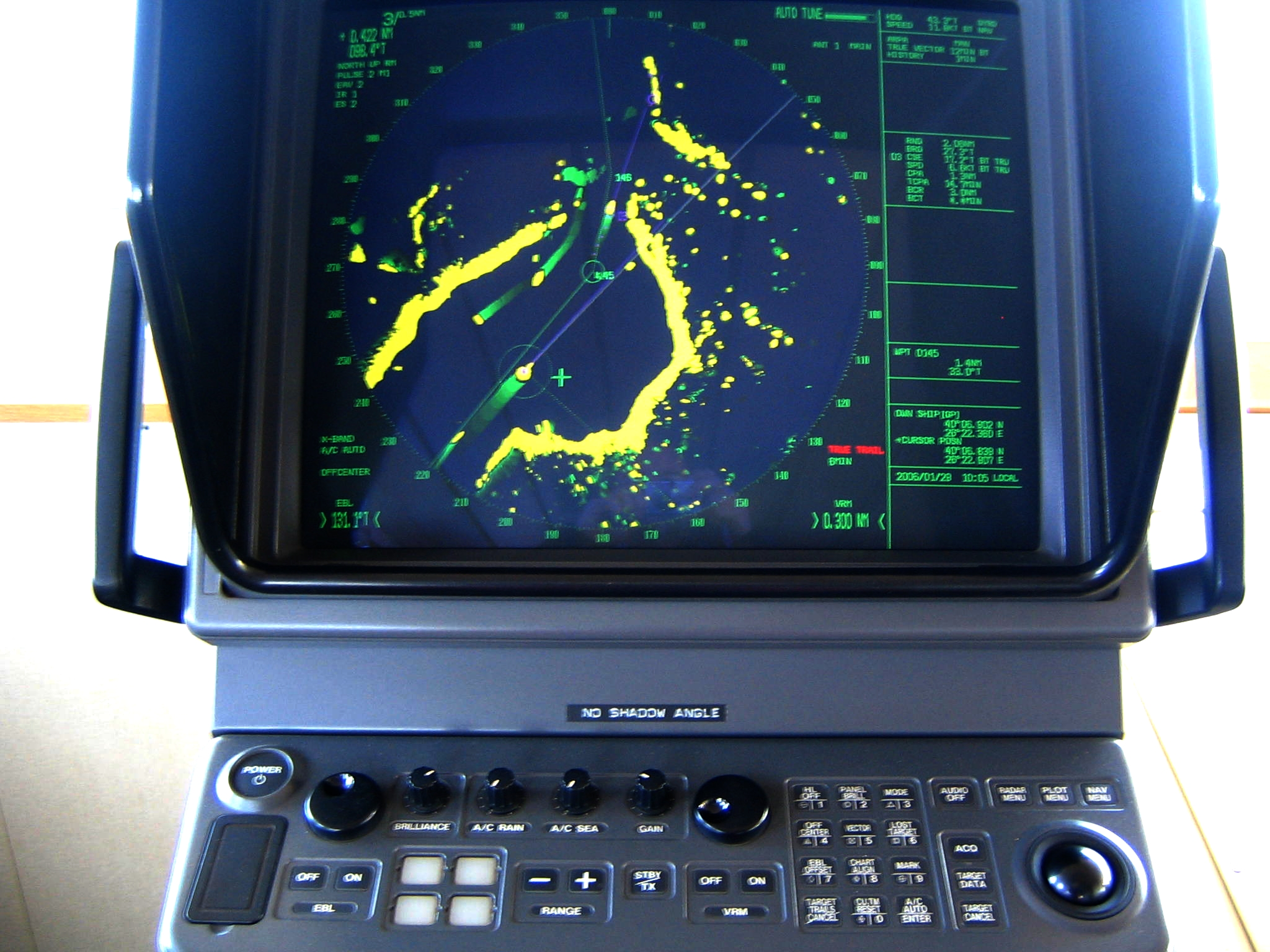
Commercial marine radar display. Land areas are shown in yellow, and vessel tracks are displayed with green "tails" on the screen

Marine radar systems can provide very useful radar navigation information for navigators on board ships. The ship's position could be fixed by the bearing and distance information of a fixed, reliable target on the radar screen.

=== Radar controls ===
Marine radar has performance adjustment controls for brightness and contrast, also manual or automatic adjustment of gain, tuning, sea clutter and rain clutter suppression, and interference reduction. Other common controls consist of range scale, bearing cursor, fix/variable range marker (VRM) or bearing/distance cursor (EBL).

== Errors ==
Marine radars are subject to similar errors of other types of radar. These include radar plotting errors such as range errors, errors in bearing and the incorrect use of own vessel's data.

== Use with other equipment ==
Radars are rarely used alone in a marine setting. A modern trend is the integration of radar with other navigation displays on a single screen, as it becomes quite distracting to look at several different screens. Therefore, displays can often overlay an electronic GPS navigation chart of ship position, and a sonar display, on the radar display. This provides a combined view of surroundings, to maneuver the ship.

In commercial ships, radars are integrated into a full suite of marine instruments including chartplotters, sonar, two-way marine radio, satellite navigation (GNSS) receivers such as the US Global Positioning System (GPS), and emergency locators (SART). With digital data buses to exchange data, these devices advanced greatly in the early 21st century. For example, some have 3D displays that allow navigators to see above, below and all around the ship, including overlays of satellite imaging.
