= François Cosserat =

French engineer and mathematician

François Nicolas Cosserat
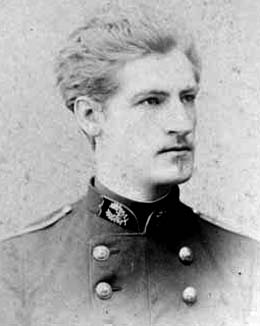
- Born: 26 October 1852; Douai, France
- Died: 22 March 1914 (aged 61); France
- Education: École Polytechnique; École Nationale des Ponts et Chaussées
- Parent: François Constant Cosserat
- Awards: Legion of Honour (1893)
- Scientific career
- Fields: Mathematics, Engineering
- Workplaces: French Railroad

François Cosserat (26 October 1852 – 22 March 1914) was a French engineer and mathematician known by his theories about deformable bodies written with his brother Eugène.

== Life and work ==
François Cosserat was the eldest of the three sons of François-Constant Cosserat, a textile manufacturer in Amiens. The three sons achieved to study in one of the grandes écoles of Paris. François studied at the École Polytechnique from 1870 to 1872 and then in the École Nationale des Ponts et Chaussées until 1875. François Cosserat followed a typical career as civil engineer in the French East Railroad Company constructing and designing bridges, tunnels, etc. In 1895 he became chief engineer. Besides his engineer career he worked with his junior brother, Eugène, in mechanics and elasticity, publishing papers and a book about it.

In 1913 he was elected president of the Société mathématique de France.

His most important work is his book, a joint work with his brother, Théorie des corps déformables (Theory of deformable bodies) (1909) in which laid the foundations of the mechanics of the generalized continua. His approach can be particularly useful in modeling nonlinear elastic inhomogeneous deformations and inelastic deformations. Other remarkable joint works are: Théorie de l'élasticité (1896), Note sur la cinématique d'un milieu continu (1897), Note sur la dynamique du point et du corps invariable (1906) and Note sur la théorie de l'action euclidienne (1909).

== See also ==
- Cosserat metamaterials
- Cosserat rod theory
- Elastica theory
- Gyrostat
- Material point method
- Noether's theorem

== Bibliography ==
- Bagdoev, Alexander G.; Erofeyev, Vladimir I.; Shekoyan, Ashot V. (2016). Wave Dynamics of Generalized Continua. Springer. ISBN 978-3-642-37266-7.
- Brocato, Maurizio; Chatzis, Konstantinos (2009). "Les frères Cosserat : brève introduction à leur vie et à leurs travaux en mécanique. Introduction.". In Cosserat, E. et F.; A. Hermann et fils (eds.). Théorie des corps déformables. réed (in French). Hermann. pp. iii–xiv.
- Papamichos, Euripides (2010). "Continua with microstructure: Cosserat theory". European Journal of Environmental and Civil Engineering. 14 (8–9): 1011–1029. doi:10.1080/19648189.2010.9693277. ISSN 1964-8189. S2CID 122107214.
- Pommaret, J.F. (1997). "François Cosserat et le secret de la théorie mathématique de l'élasticité". Annales des Ponts et Chaussées. 82: 59–66. ISSN 0152-9668.
- Rubin, M.B. (2000). Cosserat Theories: Shells, Rods and Points. Springer. ISBN 978-90-481-5531-6.
