= Powerball (disambiguation) =

Powerball is a multi-state lottery game in the United States.

Powerball may also refer to:

== Lotteries ==
- Powerball (Australia), a lottery operated in Australia
- The Powerball game of Lotto New Zealand
- The PowerBall game in the South African National Lottery

== Arts, entertainment, and media ==
- Powerball (video game), a game for the Sega Genesis
- Powerball, an event on the sports competition show American Gladiators
- Powerball, a mode in the strategy shooting game GunBound
- Powerballin', a 2004 Chingy album

== Other uses ==
- Powerball, a brand of gyroscopic exercise tool
- Powerballing, alternate name for the drug speedball
