= FIDYST =

Software

FIDYST 2
- Developer: Fraunhofer Institute for Industrial Mathematics
- Stable release: 2.16.12 / 15 December 2016
- Written in: C++
- Operating system: Unix/Linux, Microsoft Windows
- Type: Simulation software
- License: Proprietary
- Website: www.itwm.de

FIDYST is a proprietary simulation tool developed by the Fraunhofer Institute for Industrial Mathematics that simulates fibers in turbulent flows. The name FIDYST is an acronym and means Fiber Dynamics Simulation Tool.

== History ==
In 1995 the Fraunhofer Institute for Industrial Mathematics started a research project in order to simulate the paper transport in a printing machine. The transport of papers in printing machines can be modelled as two-dimensional fluid-structure interaction problem. The equations describing the dynamics of the paper transport are derived from shell models based on continuum mechanics that are equivalent to rod models for fiber dynamics. In order to simulate nonwoven production processes the Fraunhofer Institute for Industrial Mathematics extended the Cosserat rod models by a stochastic drag model for fibers in turbulent flows. FIDYST demonstrated its proof of concept 2007. At the EDANA Symposium 2007 the industrial company Oerlikon Neumag presented a new pilot plant where FIDYST had successfully been applied to increase the tenacity of the produced nonwoven. In 2012 the software code was ported from C to C++. 2014 the interaction of fibers with machinery parts was introduced in FIDYST. The latest release of FIDYST can simulate staple fibers.

== Application ==
FIDYST simulates the dynamics of elastic, line shaped objects in a very general way. Hence, there is a broad spectrum of different applications for FIDYST. Of particular importance are production processes of technical textiles . With FIDYST engineers simulate

- Spunbond processes,
- meltblown processes, and
- Airlay processes.

The simulations of the fiber dynamics are used to optimize the geometry of the production plant and the operating conditions. Goal of the optimization is an improved quality of the final product and reduced energy and raw material consumption at the same time.

FIDYST runs under Linux and Windows.

== Literature ==
- Wegener, Raimund; Marheineke, Nicole; Hietel, Dietmar (2015). "Virtual Production of Filaments and Fleeces". In Neunzert, Helmut; Prätzel-Wolters, Dieter (eds.). Currents in Industrial Mathematics. Springer Berlin Heidelberg. pp. 103–162. doi:10.1007/978-3-662-48258-2_6. ISBN 978-3-662-48257-5.
