= Gyroscope =

Device for measuring or maintaining orientation

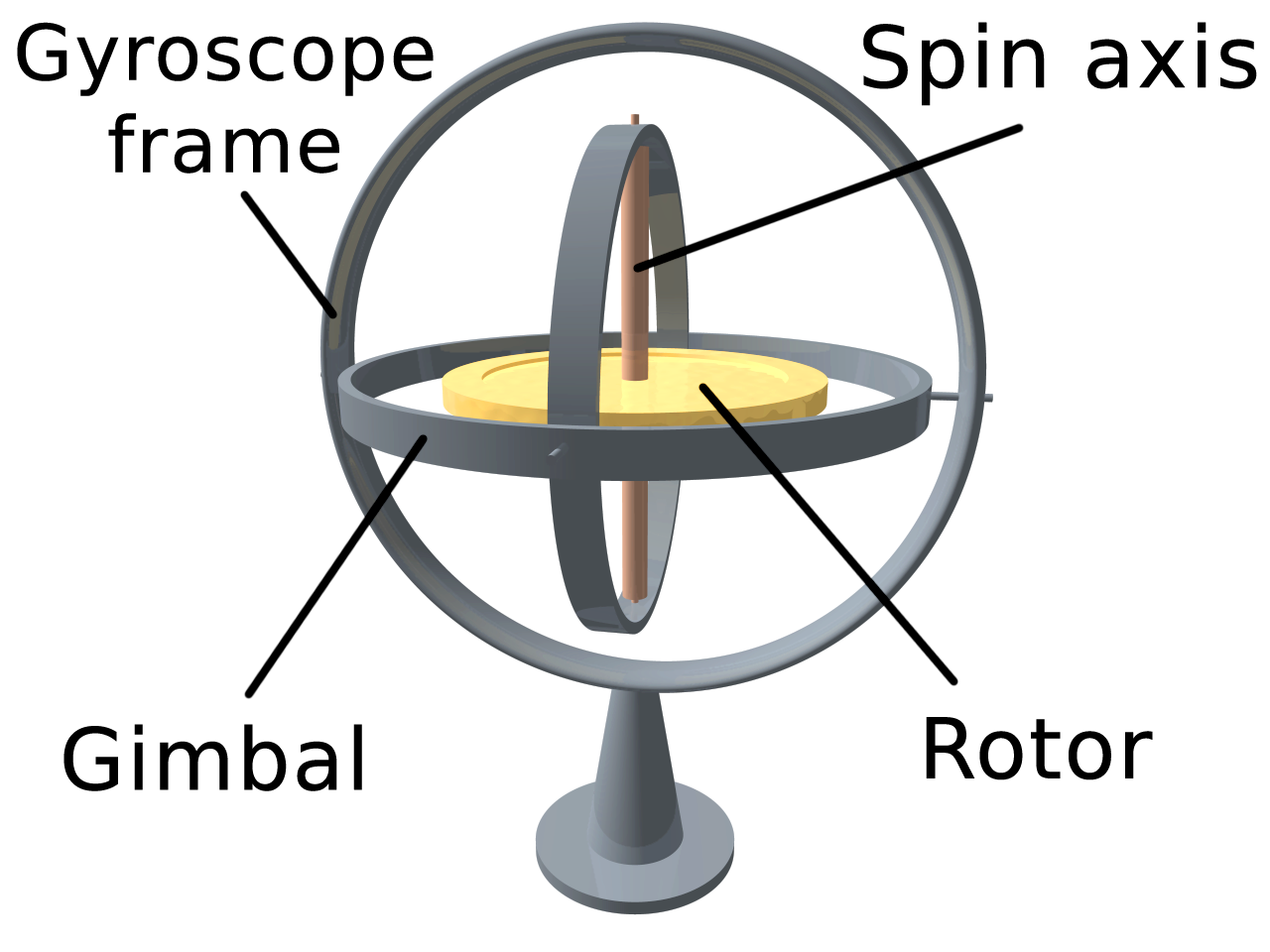
A gyroscope

A gyroscope in operation, showing the freedom of rotation in all three axes. The rotor will maintain its spin axis direction regardless of the orientation of the outer frame.

A gyroscope (from Ancient Greek γῦρος gŷros 'round' and σκοπέω skopéō 'to look') is a device used for measuring or maintaining orientation and angular velocity. It is a spinning wheel or disc in which the axis of rotation (spin axis) is free to assume any orientation by itself. When rotating, the orientation of this axis is unaffected by tilting or rotation of the mounting, due to the conservation of angular momentum.

Gyroscopes based on other operating principles also exist, such as the microchip-packaged MEMS gyroscopes found in electronic devices (sometimes called gyrometers), solid-state ring lasers, fibre optic gyroscopes, and the extremely sensitive quantum gyroscope.

Applications of gyroscopes include inertial navigation systems, such as in the Hubble Space Telescope, or inside the steel hull of a submerged submarine. Due to their precision, gyroscopes are also used in gyrotheodolites to maintain direction in tunnel mining. Gyroscopes can be used to construct gyrocompasses, which complement or replace magnetic compasses (in ships, aircraft and spacecraft, vehicles in general), to assist in stability (bicycles, motorcycles, and ships; known as gyrostabilization) or be used as part of an inertial guidance system.

MEMS (microelectromechanical system) gyroscopes are popular in some consumer electronics, such as smartphones.

== Description and diagram ==
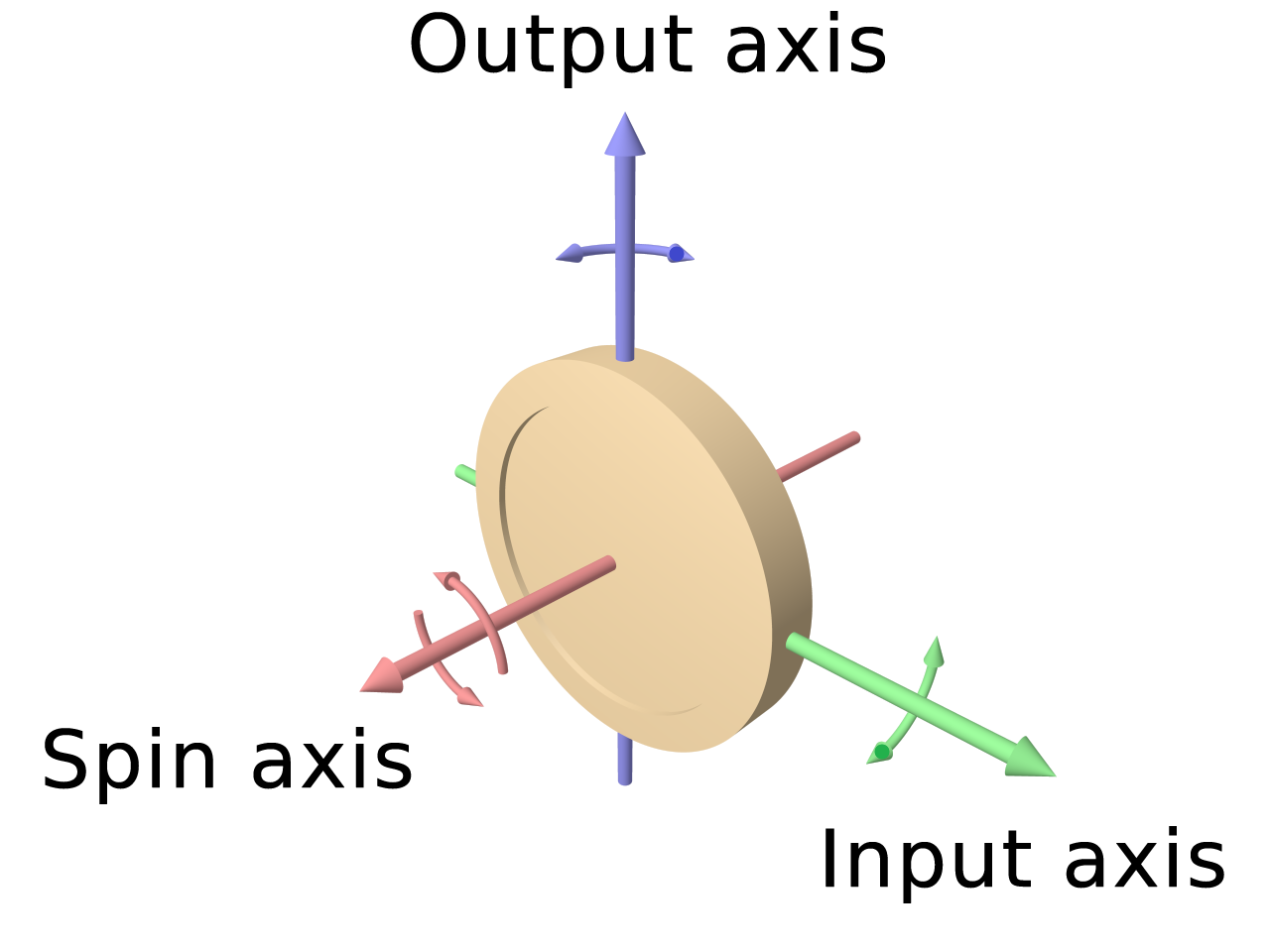
Diagram of a gyro wheel. Reaction arrows about the output axis (blue) correspond to forces applied about the input axis (green), and vice versa.

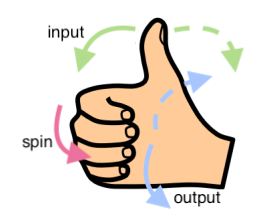
Right hand rule for gyroscope - if curled fingers indicate spin direction - then forces applied about input axis (angular momentum - thumb) cause reaction about output axis (torque - palm)

A gyroscope is an instrument, consisting of a wheel mounted into two or three gimbals providing pivoted supports, for allowing the wheel to rotate about a single axis. A set of three gimbals, one mounted on the other with orthogonal pivot axes, may be used to allow a wheel mounted on the innermost gimbal to have an orientation remaining independent of the orientation, in space, of its support.

In the case of a gyroscope with two gimbals, the outer gimbal, which is the gyroscope frame, is mounted so as to pivot about an axis in its own plane determined by the support. This outer gimbal possesses one degree of rotational freedom and its axis possesses none. The second (inner) gimbal is mounted in the gyroscope frame (outer gimbal) so as to pivot about an axis in its own plane that is always perpendicular to the pivotal axis of the gyroscope frame (outer gimbal). This inner gimbal has two degrees of rotational freedom.

The axle of the spinning wheel (the rotor) defines the spin axis. The rotor is constrained to spin about an axis, which is always perpendicular to the axis of the inner gimbal. So the rotor possesses three degrees of rotational freedom and its axis possesses two. The rotor responds to a force applied to the input axis by a reaction force to the output axis.

A gyroscope flywheel will roll or resist about the output axis depending upon whether the output gimbals are of a free or fixed configuration. An example of some free-output-gimbal devices is the attitude control gyroscopes used to sense or measure the pitch, roll and yaw attitude angles in a spacecraft or aircraft.

Animation of a gyro wheel in action

The centre of gravity of the rotor can be in a fixed position. The rotor simultaneously spins about one axis and is capable of oscillating about the two other axes, and it is free to turn in any direction about the fixed point (except for its inherent resistance caused by rotor spin). Some gyroscopes have mechanical equivalents substituted for one or more of the elements. For example, the spinning rotor may be suspended in a fluid, instead of being mounted in gimbals. A control moment gyroscope (CMG) is an example of a fixed-output-gimbal device that is used on spacecraft to hold or maintain a desired attitude angle or pointing direction using the gyroscopic resistance force.

In some special cases, the outer gimbal (or its equivalent) may be omitted so that the rotor has only two degrees of freedom. In other cases, the centre of gravity of the rotor may be offset from the axis of oscillation, and thus the centre of gravity of the rotor and the centre of suspension of the rotor may not coincide.

== History ==
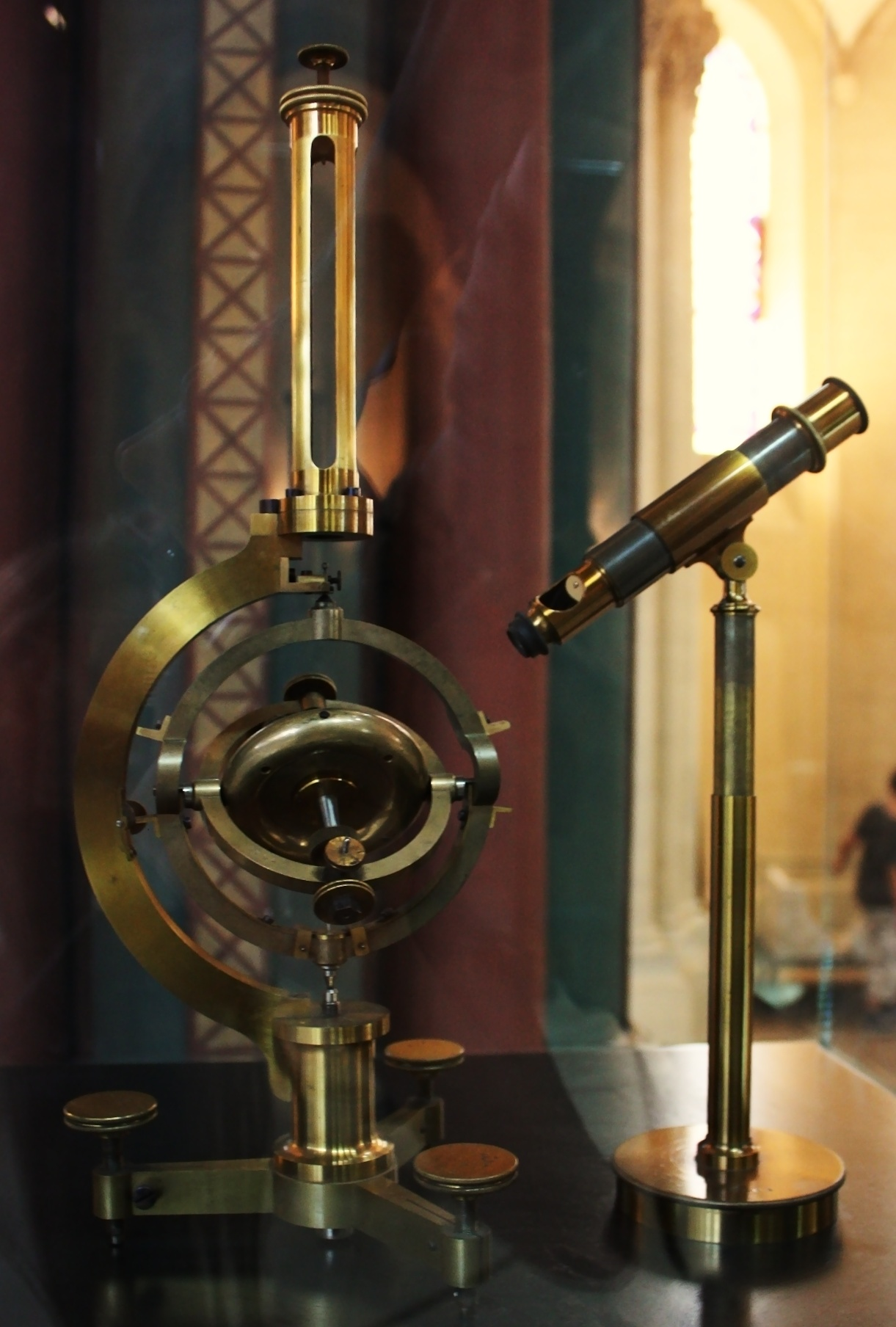
Gyroscope designed by Léon Foucault in 1852. Replica built by Dumoulin-Froment for the Exposition universelle in 1867. National Conservatory of Arts and Crafts museum, Paris.

=== Early similar devices ===
Essentially, a gyroscope is a top combined with a pair of gimbals. Tops were invented in many different civilizations, including classical Greece, Rome, and China. Most of these were not utilized as instruments.

The first known apparatus similar to a gyroscope (the "Whirling Speculum" or "Serson's Speculum") was invented by John Serson in 1743. It was used as a level, to locate the horizon in foggy or misty conditions.

The first instrument used more like an actual gyroscope was made by Johann Bohnenberger of Germany, who first wrote about it in 1817. At first he called it the "Machine". Bohnenberger's machine was based on a rotating massive sphere. In 1832, American Walter R. Johnson developed a similar device that was based on a rotating disc. The French mathematician Pierre-Simon Laplace, working at the École Polytechnique in Paris, recommended the machine for use as a teaching aid, and thus it came to the attention of Léon Foucault.

=== Foucault's gyroscope ===
In 1852, Foucault used it in an experiment demonstrating the rotation of the Earth.

It was Foucault who gave the device its modern name, in an experiment to see (Greek skopeein 'to see') the Earth's rotation (Greek gyros 'circle, rotation'), which was visible in the 8 to 10 minutes before friction slowed the spinning rotor.

=== Commercialization ===
In the 1860s, the advent of electric motors made it possible for a gyroscope to spin indefinitely; this led to the first prototype heading indicators, and a rather more complicated device, the gyrocompass. The first functional gyrocompass was patented in 1904 by German inventor Hermann Anschütz-Kaempfe. American Elmer Sperry followed with his own design later that year, and other nations soon realized the military importance of the invention—in an age in which naval prowess was the most significant measure of military power—and created their own gyroscope industries. The Sperry Gyroscope Company quickly expanded to provide aircraft and naval stabilizers as well, and other gyroscope developers followed suit.

Circa 1911 the L. T. Hurst Mfg Co of Indianapolis started producing the "Hurst gyroscope" a toy gyroscope with a pull string and pedestal. Manufacture was at some point switched to Chandler Mfg Co (still branded Hurst). The product was later renamed to a "Chandler gyroscope", presumably because Chandler Mfg Co. took over rights to the gyroscope. Chandler continued to produce the toy until the company was purchased by TEDCO Inc. in 1982. The gyroscope is still produced by TEDCO today.

In the first several decades of the 20th century, other inventors attempted (unsuccessfully) to use gyroscopes as the basis for early black box navigational systems by creating a stable platform from which accurate acceleration measurements could be performed (in order to bypass the need for star sightings to calculate position). Similar principles were later employed in the development of inertial navigation systems for ballistic missiles.

During World War II, the gyroscope became the prime component for aircraft and anti-aircraft gun sights. After the war, the race to miniaturize gyroscopes for guided missiles and weapons navigation systems resulted in the development and manufacturing of so-called midget gyroscopes that weighed less than 3 ounces (85 g) and had a diameter of approximately 1 inch (2.5 cm). Some of these miniaturized gyroscopes could reach a speed of 24,000 revolutions per minute in less than 10 seconds.

Gyroscopes continue to be an engineering challenge. For example, the axle bearings have to be extremely accurate. A small amount of friction is deliberately introduced to the bearings, since otherwise an accuracy of better than $10^{-7}$ of an inch (2.5 nm) would be required.

Three-axis MEMS-based gyroscopes are also used in portable electronic devices such as tablets, smartphones, and smartwatches. This adds to the 3-axis acceleration sensing ability available on previous generations of devices. Together these sensors provide 6 component motion sensing; accelerometers for X, Y, and Z movement, and gyroscopes for measuring the extent and rate of rotation in space (roll, pitch and yaw). Some devices additionally incorporate a magnetometer to provide absolute angular measurements relative to the Earth's magnetic field. Newer MEMS-based inertial measurement units incorporate up to all nine axes of sensing in a single integrated circuit package, providing inexpensive and widely available motion sensing.

== Gyroscopic principles ==
All spinning objects have gyroscopic properties. The main properties that an object can experience in any gyroscopic motion are rigidity in space and precession.

=== Rigidity in space ===
Rigidity in space describes the principle that a gyroscope remains in the fixed position on the plane in which it is spinning, unaffected by the Earth's rotation. such as with a rotating bike wheel. Early forms of gyroscope (not then known by the name) were used to demonstrate the principle.

=== Precession ===
A simple case of precession, also known as steady precession, can be described by the following relation to a moment:

$$\sum M_x = -I{\phi'}^2 \sin\theta \cos\theta +I_z\phi' \sin\theta(\phi' \cos\theta + \psi' )$$

where $\phi'$ represents precession, $\psi'$ is represented by spin, $\theta$ is the nutation angle, and $I$ represents inertia along its respective axis. This relation is only valid when the moments along the Y and Z axes are equal to 0.

The equation can be further reduced noting that the angular velocity along the z-axis is equal to the sum of the precession and the spin: $\omega_z = \phi' \cos \theta + \psi'$, Where $\omega_z$ represents the angular velocity along the z axis.

$$\sum M_x =  -I{\psi'}^2 \sin \theta \cos \theta + I_z \psi' (\sin\theta)\omega_z$$

or

$\sum M_x = \psi' \sin \theta (I_z\omega_z-I\psi' \cos \theta)$

Gyroscopic precession is torque induced. It is the rate of change of the angular momentum that is produced by the applied torque. Precession produces counterintuitive dynamic results such as a spinning top not falling over. Precession is used in aerospace applications for sensing changes of attitude and direction.

== Contemporary uses ==
=== Steadicam ===
A Steadicam rig was employed during the filming of the 1983 film Return of the Jedi, in conjunction with two gyroscopes for extra stabilization, to film the background plates for the speeder bike chase. Steadicam inventor Garrett Brown operated the shot, walking through a redwood forest, running the camera at one frame per second. When projected at 24 frames per second, it gave the impression of flying through the air at perilous speeds.

=== Heading indicator ===
The heading indicator or directional gyro has an axis of rotation that is set horizontally, pointing north. Unlike a magnetic compass, it does not seek north. When being used in an airplane, for example, it will slowly drift away from north and will need to be reoriented periodically, using a magnetic compass as a reference.

=== Gyrocompass ===
Unlike a directional gyro or heading indicator, a gyrocompass seeks north. It detects the rotation of the Earth about its axis and seeks the true north, rather than the magnetic north. Gyrocompasses usually have built-in damping to prevent overshoot when re-calibrating from sudden movement.

=== Accelerometer ===
By determining an object's acceleration and integrating over time, the velocity of the object can be calculated. Integrating again, position can be determined. The simplest accelerometer is a weight that is free to move horizontally, which is attached to a spring and a device to measure the tension in the spring. This can be improved by introducing a counteracting force to push the weight back and to measure the force needed to prevent the weight from moving. A more complicated design consists of a gyroscope with a weight on one of the axes. The device will react to the force generated by the weight when it is accelerated, by integrating that force to produce a velocity.

== Variations ==
=== Gyrostat ===
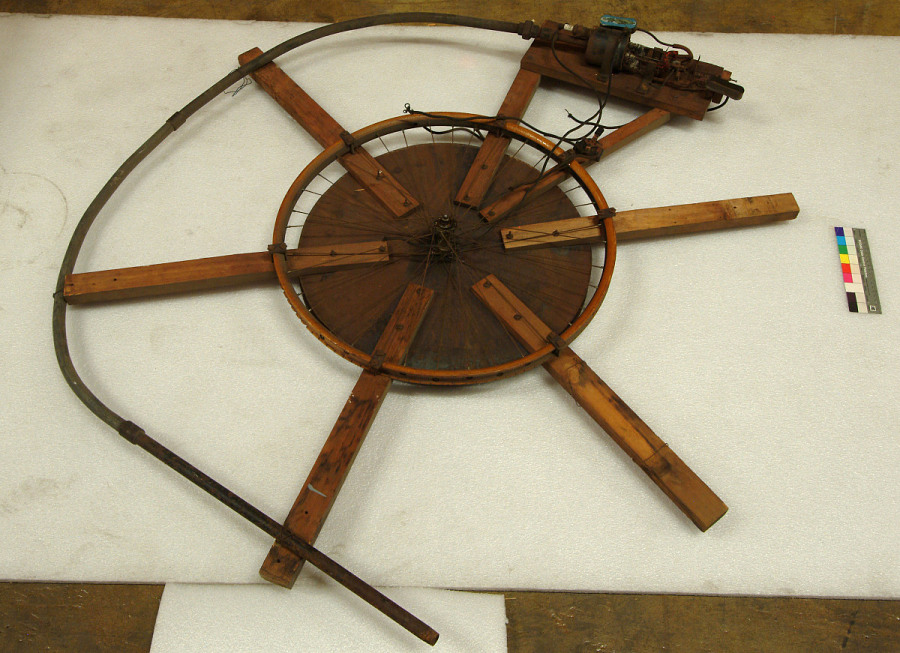
A gyrostat from 1929 made from a bicycle wheel. It was used by Robert Goddard to test gyroscopic control of rockets.

A gyrostat consists of a massive flywheel concealed in a solid casing. Its behaviour on a table, or with various modes of suspension or support, serves to illustrate the curious reversal of the ordinary laws of static equilibrium due to the gyrostatic behaviour of the interior invisible flywheel when rotated rapidly. The first gyrostat was designed by Lord Kelvin to illustrate the more complicated state of motion of a spinning body when free to wander about on a horizontal plane, like a top spun on the pavement, or a bicycle on the road. Kelvin also made use of gyrostats to develop mechanical theories of the elasticity of matter and of the ether. In modern continuum mechanics there is a variety of these models, based on ideas of Lord Kelvin. They represent a specific type of Cosserat theories (suggested for the first time by Eugène Cosserat and François Cosserat), which can be used for description of artificially made smart materials as well as of other complex media. One of them, so-called Kelvin's medium, has the same equations as magnetic insulators near the state of magnetic saturation in the approximation of quasimagnetostatics.

In modern times, the gyrostat concept is used in the design of attitude control systems for orbiting spacecraft and satellites. For instance, the Mir space station had three pairs of internally mounted flywheels known as gyrodynes or control moment gyroscopes.

In physics, there are several systems whose dynamical equations resemble the equations of motion of a gyrostat. Examples include a solid body with a cavity filled with an inviscid, incompressible, homogeneous liquid, the static equilibrium configuration of a stressed elastic rod in elastica theory, the polarization dynamics of a light pulse propagating through a nonlinear medium, the Lorenz system in chaos theory, and the motion of an ion in a Penning trap mass spectrometer.

=== MEMS gyroscope ===
A microelectromechanical systems (MEMS) gyroscope is a miniaturized gyroscope found in electronic devices. It takes the idea of the Foucault pendulum and uses a vibrating element. This kind of gyroscope was first used in military applications but has since been adopted for increasing commercial use.

=== HRG ===
The hemispherical resonator gyroscope (HRG), also called a wine-glass gyroscope or mushroom gyro, makes use of a thin solid-state hemispherical shell, anchored by a thick stem. This shell is driven to a flexural resonance by electrostatic forces generated by electrodes which are deposited directly onto separate fused-quartz structures that surround the shell. Gyroscopic effect is obtained from the inertial property of the flexural standing waves.

=== VSG or CVG ===
A vibrating structure gyroscope (VSG), also called a Coriolis vibratory gyroscope (CVG), uses a resonator made of different metallic alloys. It takes a position between the low-accuracy, low-cost MEMS gyroscope and the higher-accuracy and higher-cost fiber optic gyroscope. Accuracy parameters are increased by using low-intrinsic damping materials, resonator vacuumization, and digital electronics to reduce temperature dependent drift and instability of control signals.

High quality wine-glass resonators are used for precise sensors like HRG.

=== DTG ===
A dynamically tuned gyroscope (DTG) is a rotor suspended by a universal joint with flexure pivots. The flexure spring stiffness is independent of spin rate. However, the dynamic inertia (from the gyroscopic reaction effect) from the gimbal provides negative spring stiffness proportional to the square of the spin speed (Howe and Savet, 1964; Lawrence, 1998). Therefore, at a particular speed, called the tuning speed, the two moments cancel each other, freeing the rotor from torque, a necessary condition for an ideal gyroscope.

=== Ring laser gyroscope ===
A ring laser gyroscope relies on the Sagnac effect to measure rotation by measuring the shifting interference pattern of a beam split into two separate beams which travel around the ring in opposite directions.

When the Boeing 757-200 entered service in 1983, it was equipped with the first suitable ring laser gyroscope. This gyroscope took many years to develop, and the experimental models went through many changes before it was deemed ready for production by the engineers and managers of Honeywell and Boeing. It was an outcome of the competition with mechanical gyroscopes, which kept improving. The reason Honeywell, of all companies, chose to develop the laser gyro was that they were the only one that did not have a successful line of mechanical gyroscopes, so they would not be competing against themselves. The first problem they had to solve was that with laser gyros rotations below a certain minimum could not be detected at all, due to a problem called "lock-in", whereby the two beams act like coupled oscillators and pull each other's frequencies toward convergence and therefore zero output. The solution was to shake the gyro rapidly so that it never settled into lock-in. Paradoxically, too regular of a dithering motion produced an accumulation of short periods of lock-in when the device was at rest at the extremities of its shaking motion. This was cured by applying a random white noise to the vibration. The material of the block was also changed from quartz to a new glass ceramic Cer-Vit, made by Owens Corning, because of helium leaks.

=== Fiber optic gyroscope ===
A fiber optic gyroscope also uses the interference of light to detect mechanical rotation. The two-halves of the split beam travel in opposite directions in a coil of fiber optic cable as long as 5 km. Like the ring laser gyroscope, it makes use of the Sagnac effect.

=== London moment ===
A London moment gyroscope relies on the quantum-mechanical phenomenon, whereby a spinning superconductor generates a magnetic field whose axis lines up exactly with the spin axis of the gyroscopic rotor. A magnetometer determines the orientation of the generated field, which is interpolated to determine the axis of rotation. Gyroscopes of this type can be extremely accurate and stable. For example, those used in the Gravity Probe B experiment measured changes in gyroscope spin axis orientation to better than 0.5 milliarcseconds (1.4×10^{−7} degrees, or about 2.4×10^{−9} radians) over a one-year period. This is equivalent to an angular separation the width of a human hair viewed from 32 kilometers (20 mi) away.

The GP-B gyro consists of a nearly-perfect spherical rotating mass made of fused quartz, which provides a dielectric support for a thin layer of niobium superconducting material. To eliminate friction found in conventional bearings, the rotor assembly is centered by the electric field from six electrodes. After the initial spin-up by a jet of helium which brings the rotor to 4,000 RPM, the polished gyroscope housing is evacuated to an ultra-high vacuum to further reduce drag on the rotor. Provided the suspension electronics remain powered, the extreme rotational symmetry, lack of friction, and low drag will allow the angular momentum of the rotor to keep it spinning for about 15,000 years.

A sensitive DC SQUID that can discriminate changes as small as one quantum, or about 2 ×10^{−15} Wb, is used to monitor the gyroscope. A precession, or tilt, in the orientation of the rotor causes the London moment magnetic field to shift relative to the housing. The moving field passes through a superconducting pickup loop fixed to the housing, inducing a small electric current. The current produces a voltage across a shunt resistance, which is resolved to spherical coordinates by a microprocessor. The system is designed to minimize Lorentz torque on the rotor.

== Other examples ==
=== Helicopters ===
The main rotor of a helicopter acts like a gyroscope. Its motion is influenced by the principle of gyroscopic precession which is the concept that a force applied to a spinning object will have a maximum reaction approximately 90 degrees later. The reaction may differ from 90 degrees when other stronger forces are in play. To change direction, helicopters must adjust the pitch angle and the angle of attack.

=== Gyro X ===
Gyro X prototype vehicle created by Alex Tremulis and Thomas Summers in 1967. The car utilized gyroscopic precession to drive on two wheels. An assembly consisting of a flywheel mounted in a gimbal housing under the hood of the vehicle acted as a large gyroscope. The flywheel was rotated by hydraulic pumps creating a gyroscopic effect on the vehicle. A precessional ram was responsible for rotating the gyroscope to change the direction of the precessional force to counteract any forces causing the vehicle imbalance. The one-of-a-kind prototype is now at the Lane Motor Museum in Nashville, Tennessee.

== Consumer electronics ==
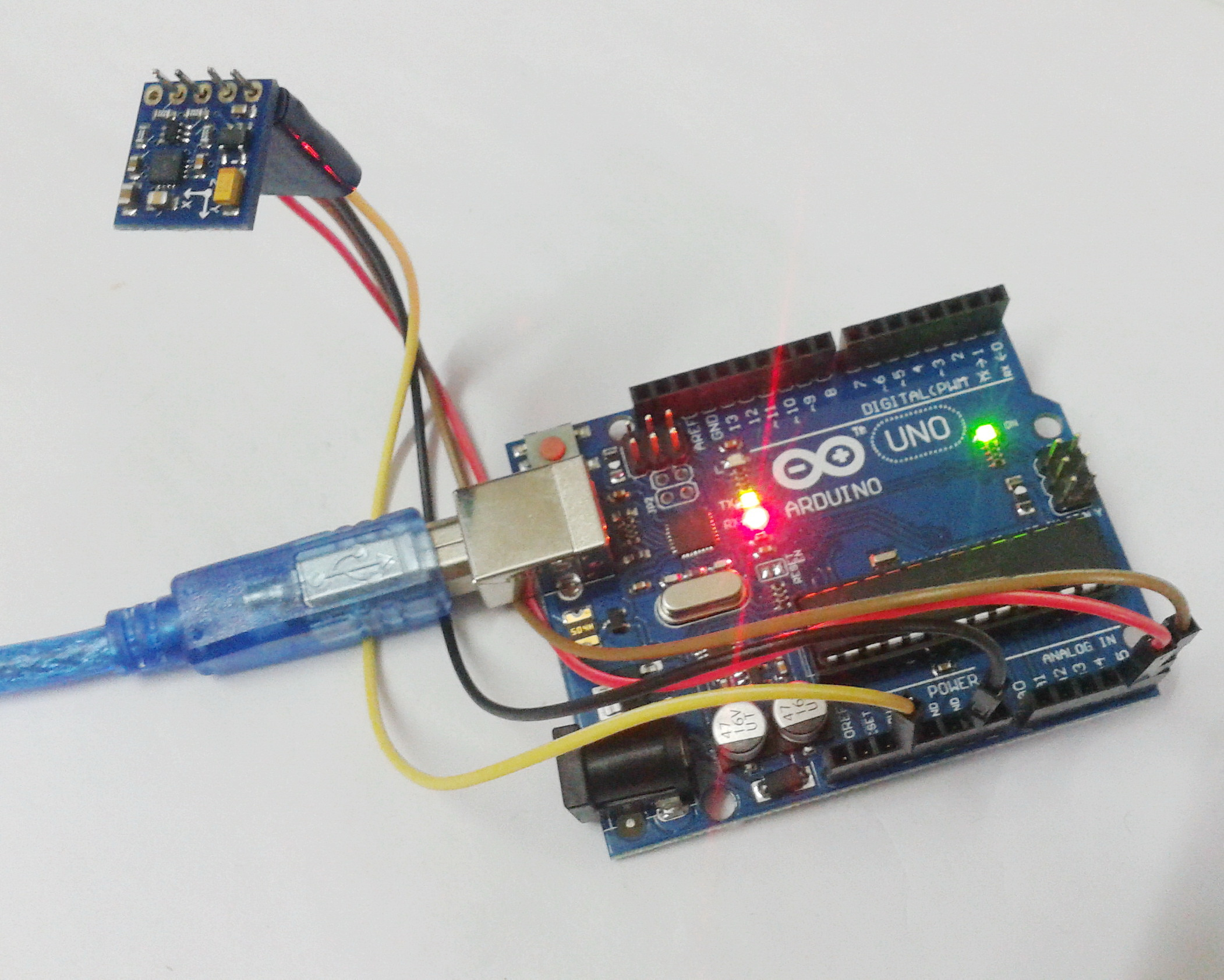
A digital gyroscope module connected to an Arduino Uno board

In addition to being used in compasses, aircraft, computer pointing devices, etc., gyroscopes have been introduced into consumer electronics.

Since the gyroscope allows the calculation of orientation and rotation, designers have incorporated them into modern technology. The integration of the gyroscope has allowed for more accurate recognition of movement within a 3D space than the previous lone accelerometer within a number of smartphones. Gyroscopes in consumer electronics are frequently combined with accelerometers for more robust direction- and motion-sensing. Examples of such applications include smartphones such as the Samsung Galaxy Note 4, HTC Titan, Nexus 5, iPhone 5s, Nokia 808 PureView and Sony Xperia, game console peripherals such as the PlayStation 3 controller and the Wii Remote, and virtual reality headsets such as the Oculus Rift. Some features of Android phones like PhotoSphere or 360 Camera and to use VR gadget do not work without a gyroscope sensor in the phone.

Nintendo has integrated a gyroscope into the Wii console's Wii Remote controller by an additional piece of hardware called "Wii MotionPlus". It is also included in the 3DS, Wii U GamePad, and Nintendo Switch Joy-Con and Pro controllers, which detect movement when turning and shaking.

Cruise ships use gyroscopes to level motion-sensitive devices such as self-leveling pool tables.

An electric powered flywheel gyroscope inserted in a bicycle wheel is sold as an alternative to training wheels.

== See also ==
- Aerotrim
- Accelerometer
- Anti-rolling gyro
- Attitude indicator
- Balancing machine
- Bicycle and motorcycle dynamics
- Countersteering
- Euler angles
- Eric Laithwaite
- Flywheel
- Gyrocar
- Gyro monorail
- Gyroscopic exercise tool
- Inertial measurement unit
- Magnetometer
- Molecular gyroscope
- Reaction wheel
- Rifling
- Rigid body dynamics
- Turn and bank indicator
- Turn coordinator
- Spin stabilization
- Stabilizer
