= Absolute angular momentum =

In meteorology, absolute angular momentum is the angular momentum in an 'absolute' coordinate system (absolute time and space).

== Introduction ==
Angular momentum L equates with the cross product of the position (vector) r of a particle (or fluid parcel) and its absolute linear momentum p, equal to mv, the product of mass and velocity. Mathematically,

$$\mathbf{L} = \mathbf{r} \times m \mathbf{v}$$

== Definition ==
Absolute angular momentum sums the angular momentum of a particle or fluid parcel in a relative coordinate system and the angular momentum of that relative coordinate system.

Meteorologists typically express the three vector components of velocity v = (u, v, w) (eastward, northward, and upward). The magnitude of the absolute angular momentum L per unit mass m

$$\left|\frac{\mathbf{L}}{m}\right| = M = u r \cos (\phi) + \Omega r^2 \cos^2(\phi)$$

where

- M represents absolute angular momentum per unit mass of the fluid parcel (in m^{2}/s),
- r represents distance from the center of the Earth to the fluid parcel (in m),
- u represents earth-relative eastward component of velocity of the fluid parcel (in m/s),
- φ represents latitude (in rad), and
- Ω represents angular rate of Earth's rotation (in rad/s, usually (2 π rad)/(1 sidereal day) ≈ 72.921150 × 10^{−6} rad/s).

The first term represents the angular momentum of the parcel with respect to the surface of the Earth, which depends strongly on weather. The second term represents the angular momentum of the Earth itself at a particular latitude (essentially constant at least on non-geological timescales).

== Applications ==
In the shallow troposphere of the Earth, humans can approximate r ≈ a, the distance between the fluid parcel and the center of the Earth approximately equal to the mean Earth radius:

$$M \approx u a \cos (\varphi) + \Omega a^2 \cos^2(\varphi)$$

where

- a represents Earth radius (in m, usually 6.371009 Mm)
- M represents absolute angular momentum per unit mass of the fluid parcel (in m^{2}/s),
- u represents Earth-relative eastward component of velocity of the fluid parcel (in m/s),
- φ represents latitude (in rad), and
- Ω represents angular rate of Earth's rotation (in rad/s, usually (2 π rad)/(1 sidereal day) ≈ 72.921150 × 10^{−6} rad/s).

At the North Pole and South Pole (latitude φ = ±90° = π/2rad), no absolute angular momentum can exist (M = 0 m^{2}/s because cos(±90°) = 0). If a fluid parcel with no eastward wind speed (u_{0} = 0 m/s) originating at the equator (φ = 0 rad so cos(φ) = cos(0 rad) = 1) conserves its angular momentum (M_{0} = M) as it moves poleward, then its eastward wind speed increases dramatically: u_{0} a cos(φ_{0}) + Ω a^{2} cos^{2}(φ_{0}) = u a cos(φ) + Ω a^{2} cos^{2}(φ). After those substitutions, Ω a^{2} = u a cos(φ) + Ω a^{2} cos^{2}(φ), or after further simplification, Ω a(1-cos^{2}(φ)) = u cos(φ). Solution for u gives Ω a(1/cos(φ) − cos(φ)) = u. If φ = 15° (cos(φ) = (1+√3)/2√2), then 72.921150 × 10^{−6} rad/s × 6.371009 Mm ×(2√2/(1+√3) − (1+√3)/2√2) ≈ 32.2 m/s ≈ u.

The zonal pressure gradient and eddy stresses cause torque that changes the absolute angular momentum of fluid parcels.
