= Joule-second =

Unit of action or angular momentum

joule-second
- Unit system: SI
- Unit of: action or angular momentum
- Symbol: J⋅s
- In SI base units: kg·m^{2}·s^{−1}

The joule-second (symbol J⋅s or J s) is the unit of action and of angular momentum in the International System of Units (SI) equal to the product of an SI derived unit, the joule (J), and an SI base unit, the second (s). The joule-second is a unit of action or of angular momentum. The joule-second also appears in quantum mechanics within the definition of the Planck constant. Angular momentum is the product of an object's moment of inertia, with the unit kg⋅m^{2} and its angular velocity with the unit rad⋅s^{−1}. This product of moment of inertia and angular velocity yields kg⋅m^{2}⋅s^{−1} or the joule-second. The Planck constant represents the energy of a wave, with the unit joule, divided by the frequency of that wave, with the unit s^{−1}. This quotient of energy and frequency also yields the joule-second (J⋅s).

== Base units ==
Expressed in SI base units the joule-second becomes kilogram-meter squared-per second or kg⋅m^{2}⋅s^{−1}. Dimensional Analysis of the joule-second yields M L^{2} T^{−1}. Note the denominator of seconds (s) in the base units.

== Confusion with joules per second ==
The joule-second (J⋅s) should not be confused with joules per second (J/s) or watts (W). In physical processes, when the unit of time appears in the denominator of a ratio, the described process occurs at a rate. For example, in discussions about speed, an object like a car travels a known distance of kilometers spread over a known number of seconds, and the car's speed is measured in the unit kilometer per hour (km/h). In physics, work per time describes a system's power, with the unit watt (W), which is equal to joules per second (J/s).

== See also ==
- Orders of magnitude (angular momentum)
- Action (physics)

Linear/translational quantities				Angular/rotational quantities			
Dimensions	1	L	L^{2}	Dimensions	1	θ	θ^{2}
T	time: t s	absement: A m s		T	time: t s		
1		distance: d, position: r, s, x, displacement m	area: A m^{2}	1		angle: θ, angular displacement: θ rad	solid angle: Ω rad^{2}, sr
T^{−1}	frequency: f s^{−1}, Hz	speed: v, velocity: v m s^{−1}	kinematic viscosity: ν, specific angular momentum: h m^{2} s^{−1}	T^{−1}	frequency: f, rotational speed: n, rotational velocity: n s^{−1}, Hz	angular speed: ω, angular velocity: ω rad s^{−1}	
T^{−2}		acceleration: a m s^{−2}		T^{−2}	rotational acceleration s^{−2}	angular acceleration: α rad s^{−2}	
T^{−3}		jerk: j m s^{−3}		T^{−3}		angular jerk: ζ rad s^{−3}	
M	mass: m kg	weighted position: M ⟨x⟩ = ∑ m x	moment of inertia: I kg m^{2}	ML			
MT^{−1}	Mass flow rate: $\dot{m}$ kg s^{−1}	momentum: p, impulse: J kg m s^{−1}, N s	action: 𝒮, actergy: ℵ kg m^{2} s^{−1}, J s	MLT^{−1}		angular momentum: L, angular impulse: ΔL kg m rad s^{−1}	
MT^{−2}		force: F, weight: F_{g} kg m s^{−2}, N	energy: E, work: W, Lagrangian: L kg m^{2} s^{−2}, J	MLT^{−2}		torque: τ, moment: M kg m rad s^{−2}, N m	
MT^{−3}		yank: Y kg m s^{−3}, N s^{−1}	power: P kg m^{2} s^{−3}, W	MLT^{−3}		rotatum: P kg m rad s^{−3}, N m s^{−1}	
