= Orders of magnitude (angular momentum) =

Comparison of a wide range of angular momenta

The following table lists various orders of magnitude for angular momentum, in Joule-seconds.

== Table ==
Factor (J·s)	Value (J·s)	Item
10^{−34}	1.055×10^{−34}	Reduced Planck constant
10^{−34}	6.626×10^{−34}	Planck constant
10^{−11}	7.9×10^{−11}	The second hand of a wristwatch, measured from center of watch
10^{2}	250	Men's Olympic hammer throw, measured from center of thrower
10^{4}	13,300	Offset collision of two mid-sized automobiles at 50 km/h (~30 mph), measured from centerline
10^{4}	53,000	Typical large carousel in operation, modeled as a cylinder, with respect to its center
10^{29}	2.308×10^{29}	Rotational angular momentum of the Moon
10^{33}	7.07×10^{33}	Rotational angular momentum of the Earth
10^{34}	2.871×10^{34}	Orbital angular momentum of the Moon, with respect to the Earth.
10^{40}	2.661×10^{40}	Orbital angular momentum of the Earth, with respect to the Sun
10^{41}	1.676×10^{41}	Rotational angular momentum of the Sun

== See also ==
- Orders of magnitude (rotational speed)
- Orders of magnitude (momentum)
- Orders of magnitude (magnetic moment)
