= Eugène Cosserat =

French mathematician and astronomer

Eugène-Maurice-Pierre Cosserat
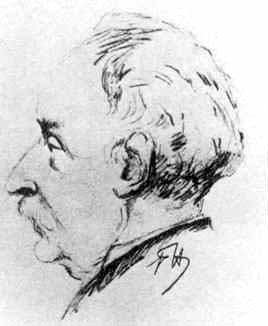
- Born: 4 March 1866; Amiens, France
- Died: 31 May 1931 (aged 65); Toulouse, France
- Scientific career
- Fields: Mathematics
- Thesis: Sur le cercle considéré comme élément générateur de l'espace (1889)
- Academic advisors: Gaston Darboux, Paul Appell, Gabriel Xavier Paul Koenigs

Eugène-Maurice-Pierre Cosserat (4 March 1866 – 31 May 1931) was a French mathematician and astronomer.

Born in Amiens, he studied at the École Normale Supérieure from 1883 to 1888.

He was on Science faculty of Toulouse University from 1889 and director of its observatory from 1908, a position he held for the rest of his life. He was elected to the Académie des Sciences in 1919.

His studies included the rings and satellites of Saturn, comets and double stars, but is best remembered for work with his engineer brother François on surface mechanics, particularly problems of elasticity.

Their work on elasticity described an extension of the classical theory to include a description of micro-rotation of material points in addition to the classical description of deformation. Their work lacked key elements and lay dormant until the 1960s at which time it was reopened by several authors. It has become known as the theory of micropolar elasticity and has remained an active research area ever since.

== Works ==
- Cosserat, E.; Cosserat, F. (1909). Théorie des Corps deformables. Paris: A, Hermann et Fils.

== Sources ==
- Who's Who in Science, pub. Marquis Who's Who, Chicago Ill. 1968 ISBN 0-8379-1001-3
- J R Levy, Biography in Dictionary of Scientific Biography (New York 1970-1990)
- L Montangerand, Eloge de Cosserat, Ann. de l'Observatoire de Toulouse 10 (1933), 20-30.

== See also ==
- Cosserat metamaterials
- Cosserat rod theory
- Elastica theory
- Gyrostat
- Material point method
- Noether's theorem
