= Continuum robot =

Type of robot

A continuum robot is a type of robot that is characterised by infinite degrees of freedom and number of joints. These characteristics allow continuum manipulators to adjust and modify their shape at any point along their length, granting them the possibility to work in confined spaces and complex environments where standard rigid-link robots cannot operate. In particular, we can define a continuum robot as an actuatable structure whose constitutive material forms curves with continuous tangent vectors. This is a fundamental definition that allows to distinguish between continuum robots and snake-arm robots or hyper-redundant manipulators: the presence of rigid links and joints allows them to only approximately perform curves with continuous tangent vectors.

The design of continuum robots is bioinspired, as the intent is to resemble biological trunks, snakes and tentacles. Several concepts of continuum robots have been commercialised and can be found in many different domains of application, ranging from the medical field to undersea exploration.

== Classification ==
Continuum robots can be categorised according to two main criteria: structure and actuation.

=== Structure ===
The main characteristic of the design of continuum robots is the presence of a continuously curving core structure, named backbone, whose shape can be actuated. The backbone must also be compliant, meaning that the backbone yields smoothly to external loads.

According to the design principles chosen for the continuum manipulator, we can distinguish between:

- single-backbone: these continuum manipulators have one central elastic backbone through which actuation/transmission elements can run.
- multi-backbone: the structure of these continuum robots has two or more elastic elements (either rods or tubes) parallel to each other and constrained with one another in some way.
- concentric-tube: the backbone is made of concentric tubes that are free to rotate and translate between each other, depending on the actuation happening at the base of the robot.

=== Actuation ===
The actuation strategy of continuum manipulators can be distinguished between extrinsic or intrinsic actuation, depending on where the actuation happens:

- extrinsic actuation: the actuation happens outside the main structure of the robot and the forces are transmitted via mechanical transmission; among these techniques, there are cable/tendon driven actuators and multi-backbone strategies.
- intrinsic actuation: the actuation mechanism operates within the structure of the robot; these strategies include pneumatic or hydraulic chambers and the shape memory effect. The Actuated Flexible Manifold (AFM), introduced by Medina, Shapiro, and Shvalb (2016), models flexible grid-based robots that approximate smooth manifolds using discrete segments, each contributing one degree of freedom. Their work provides forward and inverse kinematics for planar and spatial configurations, bridging hyper-redundant and continuum robotics.

== Advantages ==
The particular design of continuum robots offers several advantages with respect to rigid-link robots. First of all, as already said, continuum robots can more easily operate in environments that require a high level of dexterity, adaptability and flexibility. Moreover, the simplicity of their structure makes continuum robots more prone to miniaturisation. The rise of continuum robots has also paved the way for the development of soft continuum manipulators. These continuum manipulators are made of highly compliant materials that are flexible and can adapt and deform according to the surrounding environment. The "softness" of their material grants higher safety in human-robot interactions.

== Disadvantages ==
The particular design of continuum robots also introduces many challenges. To properly and safely use continuum robots, it is crucial to have an accurate force and shape sensing system. Traditionally, this is done using cameras that are not suitable for some of the applications of continuum robots (e.g. minimally invasive surgery), or using electromagnetic sensors that are however disturbed by the presence of magnetic objects in the environment. To solve this issue, in the last years fiber-Bragg-grating sensors have been proposed as a possible alternative and have shown promising results. It is also necessary to notice that while the mechanical properties of rigid-link robots are fully understood, the comprehension of the behaviour and properties of continuum robots is still subject of study and debate. This poses new challenges in developing accurate models and control algorithms for this kind of robots.

== Modelling ==
Creating an accurate model that can predict the shape of a continuum robot allows to properly control the robot's shape. There are three main approaches to model continuum robots:

- Cosserat rod theory: this approach is an exact solution to the static of a continuum robot, as it is not subject to any assumption. It solves a set of equilibrium equations between position, orientation, internal force and torque of the robot. This method requires to be solved numerically and it is therefore computationally expensive, due to its high complexity.
- Constant curvature: this technique assumes the backbone to be made of a series of mutually tangent sections that can be approximated as arcs with constant curvature. This approach is also known as piecewise constant-curvature. This assumption can be applied to the entire segment of the backbone or to its subsegments. This model has shown promising results, however it must be taken into account that the segment/subsegments of the backbone may not comply to the constant curvature assumption and therefore the model's behaviour may not entirely reflect the behaviour of the robot.
- Rigid-link model: this approach is based on the assumption that the continuum robot can be divided in small segments with rigid links. This is a strong assumption, since if the number of segments is too low, the model hardly behaves like the continuum robot, while increasing the number of segments means increasing the number of variables, and thus complexity. Despite this limitation, rigid-link modelling allows the use of the standard control techniques that are well known for rigid-link robots. It has been proven that this model can be coupled with shape and force sensing to mitigate its inaccuracy and can lead to promising results.

== Sensing ==
To develop accurate control algorithms, it is necessary to complement the presented modelling techniques with real time shape sensing. The following options are currently available:

- Electromagnetic (EM) sensing: shape is reconstructed thanks to the mutual induction between a magnetic field generator and a magnetic field sensor. The most common external EM tracking system is the commercially available NDI Aurora: small sensors can be placed on the robot and their position is tracked in an external generated magnetic field. The validity of this method has been extensively assessed, however its performance is hindered by the limited workspace, whose dimension depends on the magnetic field. Another alternative is to embed the sensors internally in the continuum robot, combining magnetic sensors with Hall-effect sensors: the magnetic field is measured at the level of the Hall-effect sensors in order to estimate the deflection of the robot. However, it has been noticed that the higher the bending of the manipulator, the higher is the estimation error, due to crosstalk between sensors and magnets.
- Optical sensing: fiber Bragg grating sensors incorporated in an optical fiber can be embedded into the backbone of the continuum robot to estimate its shape; these sensors can only reflect a small range of the input light spectrum depending on their strain; therefore, by measuring the strain on each sensor it is possible to obtain the shape of the robot. This type of sensor is however expensive and is more prone to breaking in case of excessive strain, and this can happen in robots that can perform high deflections.

== Control strategies ==
The control strategies can be distinguished in static and dynamic; the first one is based on the steady-state assumption, while the latter also considers the dynamic behaviour of the continuum robot. We can also differentiate between model-based controllers, that depend on a model of the robot, and model-free, that learn the robot's behaviour from data.

- Model-based static controllers: they rely on one of the modelling approaches presented above; once the model is defined, the kinematics must be inverted to obtain the desired actuator or configuration space variables. There are several ways to do this, like differential inverse kinematics, direct inversion or optimization.
- Model-free static controllers: these approaches learn directly, via machine learning techniques (e.g. regression methods and neural networks), the inverse kinematic or the direct kinematic representation of the continuum robot from collected data, and they are also known as data-driven methods. Even though these controllers present the advantage of not having to establish an accurate model of the continuum robot, they perform worse than their model-based counterpart.
- Model-based dynamic controllers: they need the formulation of the kinematic model and an associated dynamic formulation. As of 2021, they are in the early stage, as they require high computational power and high-dimensional sensory feedback. With improvements in computational power and sensing capabilities they could be crucial in industrial applications of continuum robots, where time and cost are also relevant along with accuracy.
- Model-free dynamic controllers: they are still a relatively unexplored approach. Some works that propose machine learning techniques to learn the dynamic behaviour of continuum robots have been presented, but their performance is limited by high training time and instability of the machine learning model.

Hybrid approaches, that combine model-free and model-based controllers, can also present a valid alternative.

== Applications ==
Continuum robots have been applied in many different fields.

=== Medical ===
Continuum robots have been widely applied in the medical field, in particular for minimally invasive surgery. For example, Ion by Intuitive is a robotic-assisted endoluminal platform for minimally invasive peripheral lung biopsy, that allows to reach nodules located in peripheral areas of the lungs that cannot be reached by standard instrumentations; this allows to perform early-stage diagnoses of cancer.

=== Hazardous places ===
Continuum robots offer the possibility of completing tasks in hazardous and hostile environments. For example, a quadruped robot with continuum limbs has been developed: it can walk, crawl, trot and propel to whole arm grasping to negotiate difficult obstacles.

==== Space ====
NASA has developed a continuum manipulator, named Tendril, that can extend into crevasses and under thermal blankets to access areas that would be otherwise inaccessible with conventional means.

==== Subsea ====
The AMADEUS project developed a dextrous underwater robot for grasping and manipulation tasks, while the FLAPS project created propulsion systems that replicate the mechanisms of fish swimming.

== See also ==
- Soft robotics
- Biorobotics
