= Tendon-driven robot =

Tendon-driven robots (TDR) are robots whose limbs mimic biological musculoskeletal systems. They use plastic straps to mimic muscles and tendons. Such robots are claimed to move in a "more natural" way than traditional robots that use rigid metal or plastic limbs controlled by geared actuators. TDRs can also help understand how biomechanics relates to embodied intelligence and cognition.

Challenges include effectively modeling the human body's complex motions and ensuring accurate positioning, given that the tendons are prone to stretch, which costs them strength and smooth operation.

== Existing systems ==
TDRs are the subject of considerable research and commercial systems followed.

=== COAST Guidewire Robot ===
The COAST Guidewire Robot is a work from the Georgia Institute of Technology. This robot, designed for potential use in cardiovascular procedures, uses a tendon to bend the guidewire made of nested tubes from superelastic nitinol. The design contains three coaxially aligned tubes a centrally routed tendon attached to the distal end of the middle tube. The outer tubes are made fabricated by micromachining notches through the use of lasers which allows the robot to bend with the use of the tendon. It is among the world's smallest steerable robotic systems actuated by microtendons, with an overall outer diameter of 0.4 mm.

=== Myorobotics ===
Myorobotics is a toolkit comprising muscles, tendons, joints, and bones to build diverse tendon-driven musculoskeletal robots, e.g. anthropomimetic arms with complex shoulder joints, quadrupeds, and hopping robots. Robots can be assembled, optimized, and simulated from primitives, then built and controlled either from the same software or from brain-like spiking neural networks simulated on a neuromorphic computer.

=== Roboy ===
Roboy is four feet tall and has two tendon-driven arms. Researchers announced plans to make Roboy's design open-source, allowing anyone with a 3-D printer to build and tinker with their own version.

=== Kenshiro ===
Kenshiro is a University of Tokyo robot announced in 2012. Kenshiro is somewhat larger than Roboy and includes 160 pulley-like muscles and aluminum bones that allow it to perform simple bends and poses.

=== BioRob ===
Bionic Robotics offered BioRob, a tendon-driven robotic arm for industrial use. It has a flexible mechanical structure that allows it to pick up heavy payloads even though it weighs much less than the conventional robotic arm that the company also makes. BioRob's light weight and flexible design is claimed to offer greater safety for use around human workers.

=== Caliper ===
Caliper is a framework for the simulation of tendon-driven robots. It consists of a generic physics simulator capable of utilizing computer-aided design models and tools for simulation control, data acquisition and system investigation.

=== ACT hand ===
The Anatomically Correct Testbed robotic hand uses tendons and woven finger extensor hoods to capture the biomechanical properties of the human hand. The tendons slide over 3D printed bones matching human bone shapes, reproducing the variable moment arms and some of the tendon network interactions found in the human hand. The tendons are actuated by direct drive (without gearing), allowing them to spool out freely when other tendons oppose them in the skeleton.

== See also ==
- Atlas (robot)
