= Gyroscopic exercise tool =

Device used in physical therapy

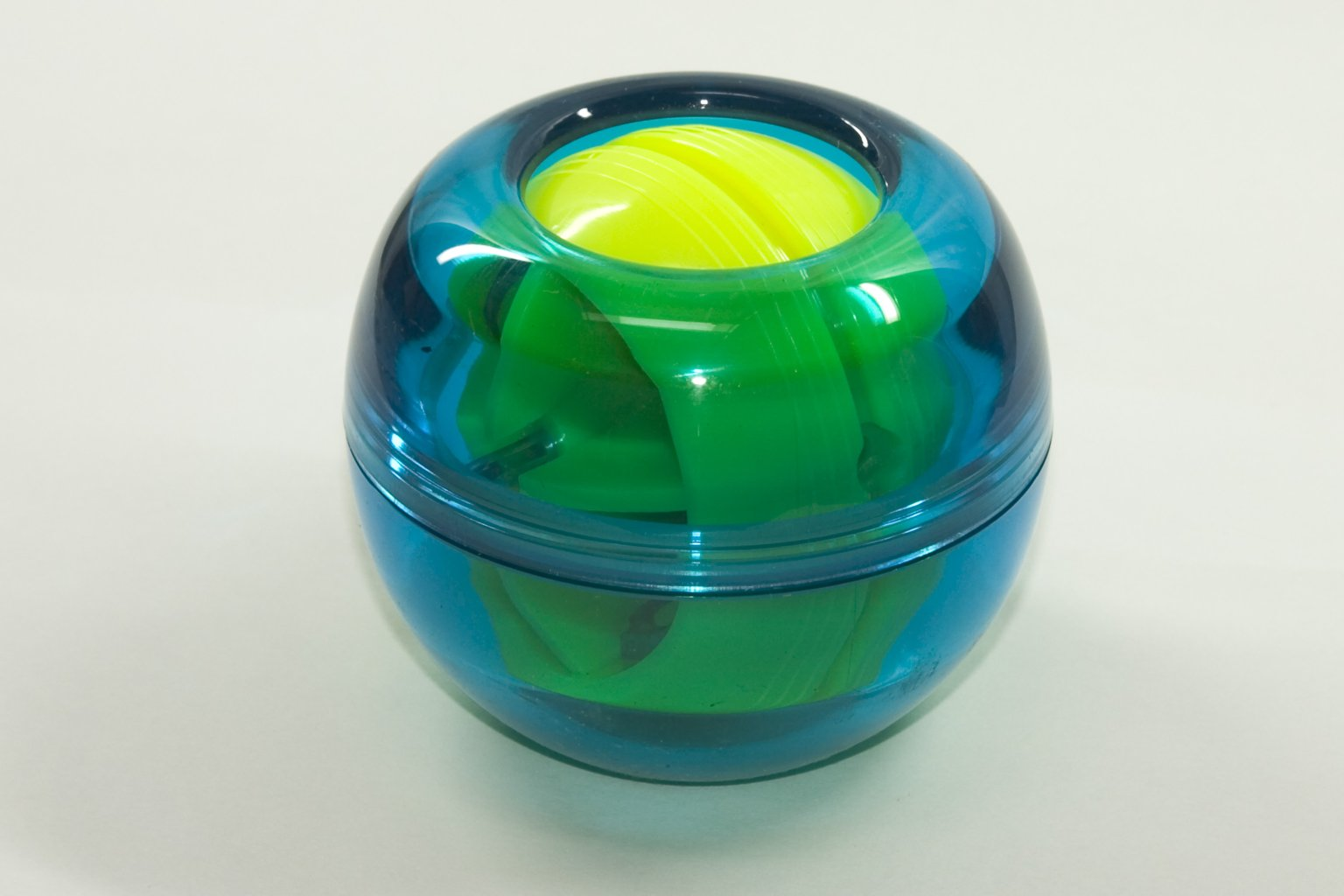
A gyroscopic wrist exerciser.

Video showing the use - from starting the rotation with a 'shoestring' over various movements with the holding hand until stopping the rotor with the second hand. The demonstrated speeds are, in part, very high and not recommended for normal exercise due to the resulting high forces.

A gyroscopic exercise tool is a specialized device used in physical therapy to improve wrist strength and promote the development of palm, wrist, forearm, and finger muscles. It can also be used as a unique demonstration of some aspects of rotational dynamics. The device consists of a tennis ball-sized plastic or metal shell surrounding a free-spinning mass, with an inner heavy core, which can be spun by a short rip string or using a self-start mechanism by means of rewinding it against a spring to give it potential energy. Once the gyroscope inside is going fast enough, the person holding the device can accelerate the spinning mass to high rotation rates by moving the wrist in a circular motion. The force enacted on the user increases as the speed of the inner gyroscope increases.

== Mechanics ==
Inside the outer shell, the spinning mass is fixed to a thin metal axle, each end trapped in a circular, equatorial groove in the outer shell. A lightweight ring with two notches for the axle ends rests in the groove. This ring can slip in the groove, allowing the ball to spin perpendicular to the rotational axis of the ring.

To increase the angular velocity of the ball, the sides of the groove exert forces on the ends of the axle. The normal and axial forces will have no effect, so the tangential force must be provided by the friction of the ring acting on the axle. The user can apply a torque on the ball by tilting the shell in any direction except in the plane of the groove or around an axis aligned with the axle. The tilting results in a shift of the axle ends along the groove. The direction and speed of the shift can be found from the formula for the precession of a gyroscope: the applied torque is equal to the cross product of the angular velocity of precession and the angular momentum of the spinning mass. The rate of rotation of the internal ball increases as the total amount of torque applied is increased. The direction of the torque does not matter, as long as it is perpendicular to the plane of rotation of the ball. The friction of the ring increases on the side opposite to the plane of rotation. This process obeys symmetry across the plane perpendicular to the axle. The only restriction to this process is that the relative speed of the surface of the axle and the side of the groove due to precession, $\mathit{\Omega}_{\mathrm{P}} R_{\mathrm{groove}}$, must exceed the relative speed due to the rotation of the spinning mass, $\omega r_{\mathrm{axle}}$. The minimum torque required to meet this condition is $I \omega^2 \left( r_{\mathrm{axle}} / R_{\mathrm{groove}} \right)$, where I is the moment of inertia of the spinning mass, and ω is its angular velocity.

Since angular acceleration will occur regardless of the direction of the applied torque, as long as it is large enough, the device will function without any fine-tuning of the driving motion. The tilting of the shell does not have to have a particular rhythm with the precession or even have the same frequency. Since kinetic friction is usually almost as strong as static friction for the materials typically used, it is not necessary to apply exactly the amount of torque needed for the axle to roll without slipping along the side of the groove. These factors allow beginners to learn to speed up the rotation after only a few minutes of practice.

By applying the proportionality of the kinetic force of friction to the normal force, $f_\mathrm{k} = \mu_\mathrm{k} F_\mathrm{n}$, where $\mu_\mathrm{k}$ is the kinetic coefficient of friction, it can be shown that the torque spinning up the mass is a factor of $\mu_\mathrm{k} \left( r_{\mathrm{axle}} / R_{\mathrm{groove}} \right)$ smaller than the torque applied to the shell. Since frictional force is essential for the device's operation, the groove must not be lubricated to allow for the friction of the ring to enact a force on the gyro.
