= Mary Yin Kyau Lee Chong =

American community leader (1882–1979)

- Born: Mary Yin Kyau Lee; December 22, 1882; Maui, Hawaii, U.S.
- Died: February 28, 1979 (aged 96); Honolulu, Hawaii, U.S.
- Occupations: Community leader; acting minister
- Spouse: How Fo Chong (m. 1900; died 1953)
- Children: 10

Mary Yin Kyau Lee Chong (December 22, 1882 – February 28, 1979) was an American community leader. A first-generation Chinese-American in Hawaii, she worked as an organist, Chinese-language teacher, and Sunday school teacher at the Congregational churches her husband, How Fo Chong, worked at: the Kula Congregational Church in Kula and the Chinese Congregational Church in Waimea, Kauai.

== Biography ==
She was born on December 22, 1882 in western Maui and moved to Honolulu during her youth. Her father, Toma Lee, a member of the Revive China Society, emigrated from China with his wife, her mother. He also worked at a sugar plantation in Makawao and ran a grocery store and tobacco store in Honolulu. After spending time at a mission school in downtown Honolulu, she became the first Chinese female pupil to attend Punahou School.

She married another first-generation Chinese-American, How Fo Chong, a priest who preached at the Mills Institute for Boys and the Fort Street Chinese Congregational Church, on November 24, 1900; they had ten children. Their wedding was the first in Hawaii's Chinese community to have a wedding march. Her son-in-law, Yao-Tsai Huang, husband of her daughter Mabel, was a Chinese-American community leader in New York City who was vice-president of the Wah Chang Corporation and president of the Chinese Chamber of Commerce of New York.

She and her husband worked at the Kula Congregational Church in Kula, where she was an interpreter and organist, as well as the church's Chinese teacher and Sunday school teacher. Originally a teacher at the church for nearby Keokea School due to limited space, she later moved to a new school in Kula, before stepping down due to childcare commitments. She also worked as an interpreter and witness when the Kula church became Maui County's birth registry headquarters.

She later moved to the Chinese Congregational Church in Waimea, Kauai, where she was a Chinese-language teacher, Sunday School teacher, organist, budget treasurer, and acting minister whenever her husband had other commitments. She later moved to Honolulu with her family after her husband retired as a minister, and she served in the First Chinese Church of Christ as an advisor to the women's auxiliary and, for two years, as their deaconess. She later participated in ceremonies celebrating Hawaii's 1959 admission to the Union and the 1965 groundbreaking of the First Chinese Church of Christ's Founder's Hall. She was named the Model Chinese Mother of 1961.

She was a Red Cross volunteer in World War I, sheltered soldiers in World War II, and during the 1918–1920 flu pandemic, she assisted with prescription filing. She was also a charter member of the Chinese Committee of the International Institute of the YWCA. She met Sun Yat-sen's wife, Soong Ching-ling, at least twice, including at the wharf at Makena and when the latter lived in Portuguese Macau in 1938. His husband died on July 6, 1953. As of 1961, she lived in the Makiki area.

She died in Honolulu on February 28, 1979, of pneumonia; she was 96.
