= Henry Singleton =

Henry Singleton may refer to:

- Henry Singleton (judge) (1682–1759), Irish judge
- Henry Singleton (painter) (1766–1839), English painter
- Henry Earl Singleton (1916–1999), American industrialist
