= Raquel Baldelomar =

Bolivian-American entrepreneur

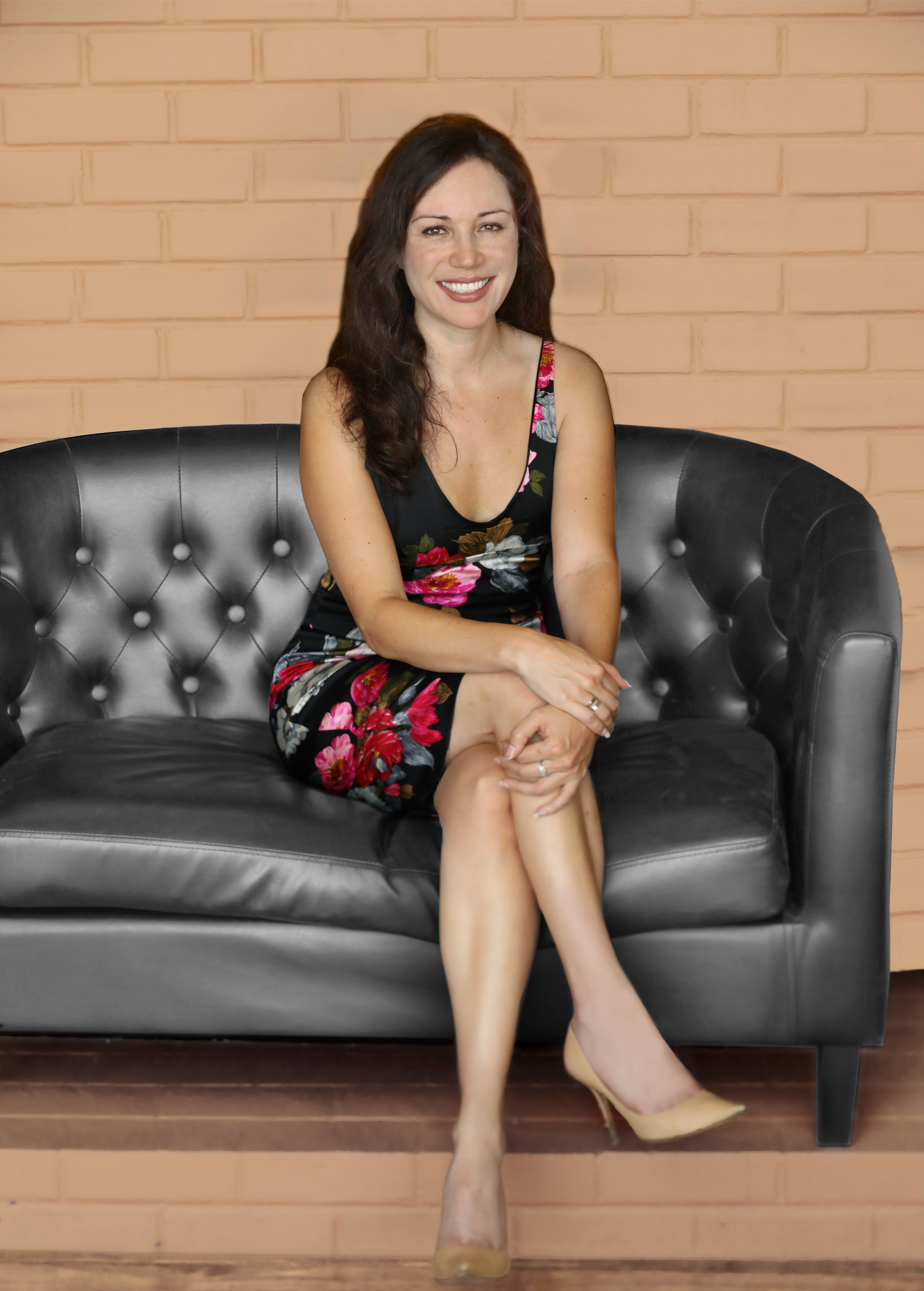
- Citizenship: United States of America
- Education: The University of Texas at Austin (2001)
- Occupations: Entrepreneur, podcast host, author, journalist
- Notable work: Sugar Crush: How to Reduce Inflammation, Reverse Nerve Damage, and Reclaim Good Health

Raquel Baldelomar is a Bolivian–American entrepreneur, author, journalist, and host of the podcast, The Mega Podcast, that airs on YouTube.

== Early life ==
Baldelomar was born in Bolivia and immigrated to Texas in the United States in 1989 at the age of 10. She is of Bolivian and American descent. Growing up, Baldelomar lived in Fort Worth, Texas. In 2001, Baldelomar graduated with a bachelor's degree in finance from the Canfield Business Honors Program at the McCombs School of Business at the University of Texas at Austin.

== Career ==
In 2001, Baldelomar began her career managing private equity portfolios for JP Morgan Private Bank. She worked at JP Morgan as a financial analyst for two years.

In 2003, she founded Quaintise, a marketing and branding agency for the healthcare, life sciences, and wellness industries after leaving corporate banking.

In 2007, she became an investor for Luxury Travel Magazine to help build the company founded by her neighbor, Christine Gray.

In 2019, she co-founded a health and wellness e-commerce business, HPD Rx, with renowned OBGYN physician Monte Swarup MD, focused on supplements for women's health and immunity.

== Media ==
The Mega Podcast is a series on YouTube hosted by Baldelomar. Started in 2022, she records interviews with other businessmen and women who talk about the challenges of balancing career, personal life, and family.

== Writing ==
In 2015, Baldelomar decided to devote more time to one of her passions – changing the conversation of healthcare from sick care management to disease prevention.

She co-authored Sugar Crush: How to Reduce Inflammation, Reverse Nerve Damage, and Reclaim Good Health with her client, Dr. Richard Jacoby after learning from Dr. Jacoby how sugar causes inflammation of the body's blood vessels, which leads to swelling, reduced blood flow and nerve constriction. The book shows how inflammation from sugar is the underlying cause of many modern diseases, including obesity, diabetes, gallbladder disease, cardiac disease, Alzheimer's, ALS, autism and more.

She is a former contributor for Forbes and CNN. She is a contributing writer for Luxury Travel Magazine.

== Works ==
- Sugar Crush: How to Reduce Inflammation, Reverse Nerve Damage, and Reclaim Good Health. Harper Wave. 2015. ISBN 978-0-06-234820-3.
