= Henry Earl Singleton =

American businessman (1916–1999)

- Born: November 27, 1916; Haslet, Texas, United States
- Died: August 31, 1999 (aged 82); Los Angeles, California, United States
- Occupations: Electrical engineer, businessman, cattle rancher
- Years active: 1940–1995
- Spouse: Caroline Wood Singleton

Henry Earl Singleton (November 27, 1916 – August 31, 1999) was an American electrical engineer, business executive, and rancher/land owner. Singleton made significant contributions to aircraft inertial guidance and was elected to the National Academy of Engineering. He co-founded Teledyne, Inc., one of America's most successful conglomerates, and was its chief executive officer for three decades. Late in life, Singleton became one of the largest holders of ranchland in the United States.

== Early background ==
Henry Singleton was raised on a small ranch near Haslet, Texas, a few miles northwest of Fort Worth. His higher education began in 1933 at North Texas Agricultural College, Arlington. After two years there, he received an appointment to the U.S. Naval Academy at Annapolis, Maryland, starting over as a Plebe (Freshman) in 1935. His roommate was fellow Plebe George A. Roberts, who would later join him in developing Teledyne. During his first two years at Annapolis, Singleton ranked first in mathematics out of a class of 820 students. A reoccurring medical problem made it necessary for him to leave the academy in 1938.

After the Academy, Singleton elected to study electrical engineering at the Massachusetts Institute of Technology (MIT), and graduated in 1940, receiving both bachelor's (Sc.B.) and master's (Sc.M.) degrees in this field. During his first year there, he was a member of a three-man team that won the Putnam Prize in the William Lowell Putnam Mathematical Competition, administered annually by the Mathematical Association of America. Another member of the team was Richard P. Feynman, a future Nobel Prize Laureate. Singleton eventually returned to MIT for doctoral studies, earning the Sc.D. degree, also in electrical engineering, in 1950.

== Initial professional work ==
After graduating from MIT in 1940 and unable to meet the physical requirements for military service, Singleton took a Civil Service position as an electrical engineer at the Naval Ordnance Laboratory, located at the Navy Yard, Washington, D.C. Singleton was involved in analyzing a process that was eventually called “degaussing,” which gives protection to cargo ships from German-laid magnetic naval mines by reducing the magnetic field surrounding a vessel's steel hull.

In 1942, Philip M. Morse, a professor at MIT, organized the Anti-Submarine Warfare Operations Research Group (ASWORG) on the staff of Admiral Ernest King, then Chief of Naval Operations. Having shown his mathematical skills in the degaussing developments, Singleton was invited to join the ASWORG. In doing so, he contributed to the founding of operations research in America.

As the Allies prepared for re-conquering Europe, the Office of Strategic Services (OSS) had a great demand for personnel with scientific capabilities. Singleton joined the OSS in 1944 and was sent to Europe. He remained there until the end of the war, and left the OSS when it was disbanded in the fall of 1945.

Singleton joined the ITT Corporation at their New York City headquarters in 1946. ITT was involved in securing its patent rights from wartime work in the US as well as in Germany. With his education and wartime experience, Singleton became a patent engineer and served ITT in this function for two years.

In the fall of 1948, Singleton returned to MIT to pursue a doctorate in electrical engineering. He obtained Jerome Wiesner as his mentor. At the Rad Lab during WWII, Wiesner had developed an important optimum linear filter and prediction technique. For his dissertation, Singleton generalized Wiesner's technique for the nonlinear situation, making a major contribution to the emerging field of information theory. He was awarded the Sc.D. degree in 1950.

While pursuing his doctorate, Singleton's efforts were sponsored under a U.S. Army Signal Corps contract at the MIT Research Laboratory for Electronics. His accomplishments there also included the design and fabrication of an early digital computer – a special-purpose machine that computed correlation functions.

After receiving his doctorate, Singleton accepted a position as a Research Associate with General Electric in Schenectady, New York. There he continued work in information theory and was introduced to advanced practices of industrial research and development. In 1951, Singleton was invited to join a new team headed by Charles B. “Tex” Thornton in the Aerospace Group at Hughes Aircraft. He accepted, and moved to Los Angeles. At Hughes, Singleton entered the emerging fields of digital and semiconductor electronics, applying these technologies in the development of the fire control system for the F-102 aircraft. In 1952, Singleton took his expertise to North American Aviation's Los Angeles Division to work on an inertial navigation system for the Navaho missile.

Tex Thornton left Hughes in 1953, forming a firm initially called Electro-Dynamics. The following year this became Litton Industries. Singleton joined Litton in 1954, and by 1958, he was the vice president and general manager of the Electronics Engineering Division. During this period, he led the development of a new type of two-degree-of-freedom, low-drift gyroscope with associated digital electronics. This formed the heart of the Litton LN-3 Inertial Navigation System, which was the first such guidance system for fighter aircraft. Genesis of the Litton Inertial Navigation System With Singleton serving as the chief salesman, the first adoption of the LN-3 was by the West German Air Force in 1959. When Singleton was named to the National Academy of Engineering in 1979, the development of this gyroscope was cited as an example of his inventive genius.

== Teledyne years ==
In June 1960, Singleton and George M. Kozmetsky, a colleague from Litton, formed Instrument Systems, located in Beverly Hills, California. Arthur Rock, a venture capitalist, financed the startup with a $450,000 investment and remained a board director for 33 years. With a Doctor of Commercial Science degree from Harvard and ten years experience in industry, Kozmetsky complemented Singleton for developing a successful enterprise. Singleton served as chairman and president, and Kozmetsky was the secretary and executive vice president. Their plan was to build a major firm primarily through acquiring companies. In October, they acquired the majority of stock in Amelco, a small electronics manufacturing plant, and within a short time bought rights to the name Teledyne and its associated logo.

=== Formation and early growth ===
Singleton's initial vision for Teledyne was that it would combine semiconductor device fabrication and control system development. Among the personnel from Amelco was Jay T. Last, who had earlier worked for William B. Shockley, co-inventor of the transistor. Immediately before Amelco, Last had been a principal at Fairchild Semiconductor, and used this experience to propel Teledyne into the integrated circuit business. Called Electron Devices, this manufacturing operation was formed as a subsidiary of Amelco. With its main facility in Mountain View, California, it was one of the pioneers in what is now commonly called the Silicon Valley.

In addition to Amelco, Singleton acquired two other electronics manufacturing firms, and by the end of 1960, Teledyne had approximately 400 employees and 80,000 square feet (7,400 m^{2}) of floor space devoted to engineering development and manufacturing. Teledyne stock was first offered to the public in May 1961. During its first full fiscal year of operations, which ended in October 1961, Teledyne had sales of $4,491,000 with a net income of $58,000.

Teledyne's growth continued in 1962, with the acquisition of companies primarily through equity agreements. Singleton began the expansion of company business into areas other than microelectronics and control systems. He formed Teledyne Systems as the centerpiece of the firm's aerospace systems business. By the end of the second fiscal year, Teledyne sales had increased 230% and net income by approximately 570%.

Over the next three years, Singleton was successful in further growing Teledyne. New companies were acquired in the microelectronics and microwave fields; power electrical products – including the first consumer products – were added. Teledyne Systems was greatly enlarged, and Teledyne Controls was established, moving the Company into the field of hydraulics. In addition to industrial sales, Teledyne won significant contracts from NASA and agencies of the Department of Defense (DoD).

In early 1965, Teledyne had a major breakthrough in winning a large contract from the U.S. Navy for an airborne computer system. Singleton had a personal involvement in the technical design. Called Integrated Helicopter Avionics System (IHAS), this program had been sought by IBM and Texas Instruments, and the win gave Teledyne a name in the military market. This caused a major increase in the stock price, from $15 to $65. By the end of the fiscal year, Teledyne had acquired 34 companies. Sales were $86.5 million with net income of $3.4 million. There were approximately 5,400 employees. Assets reached $66.5 million, and there were nearly 8 million outstanding shares of stock.

=== Singleton-Roberts years ===
A new era for Singleton and Teledyne started in 1966. In June, Kozmetsky left to become dean of the School of Business Administration at the University of Texas. In July, Vanadium-Alloy Steel Company (Vasco) was merged into Teledyne. With this merger, Singleton turned his position of President over to George A. Roberts, his close friend from Naval Academy days and who had headed Vasco. Roberts, who held a Ph.D. degree in metallurgy, had built Vasco into a mid-sized specialty steel producer headquartered in Pennsylvania. Vasco had a number of subsidiaries including Allvac, a producer of nickel, cobalt, and titanium alloys. This merger expanded the company into the Eastern U.S. and started the formation of material technologies as a major business activity of Teledyne.

Singleton, now assisted by Roberts, continued with major activities in acquiring new companies. In 1967, one of the largest of these was Brown Engineering, a firm headquartered in Huntsville, Alabama. With NASA and DoD contracts for engineering services and research near $40 million, Brown Engineering added a new line of business for Teledyne. Singleton had been particularly impressed with their Research Laboratories, and personally conducted a scientific colloquium in Huntsville for the research staff.

Ryan Aeronautical in San Diego, was also acquired by Singleton in 1967. Earlier noted for building Charles Lindberg's Spirit of St. Louis in the 1920s, Ryan was now the largest producer of unmanned drones for the military. Continental Motors was primarily owned by Ryan, and this acquisition brought Teledyne into the piston-powered engine business with both commercial and military customers.

In the remainder of the 1960s, Singleton led Teledyne in acquiring 90 more companies. A number of these were in consumer products, such as AquaTek with Water Pik and Shower Massage, Acoustic Research with revolutionary new types of speakers, and Olson Electronics that operated retail stores across America. Packard Bell had both consumer and government sales in computers and television receivers. Singleton established an International Marketing Office that handled sales in Europe, South America, and Asia, with annual sales near $800 million. When Singleton and Roberts realized that Packard Bell television manufacturing unit could neither compete with its lower cost Japanese competitors nor earn acceptable returns, they decided quickly to close it, becoming the first American producer to exit that market.

Singleton also added a diverse group of financial institutions, giving Teledyne contact and intimacy with the capital world. Thrift and loan banks were added by acquisition to units dealing with property, workers compensation, casualty and life insurance. Most of the insurance investments were later consolidated into the Argonaut and Unitrin subsidiaries, and were ultimately spun off as independent companies.

Singleton divided Teledyne into Groups, and by the end of the 1960s, there were 16 Groups with 94 profit centers in 120 locations. Company presidents were given considerable freedom in their operations, but corporate maintained very close financial control and capital management. Teledyne sales in 1969 were $1.3 billion and net income was $60 million. The stock had a 2-for-1 split during 1967 and the same split in 1969.

As Teledyne moved into its second decade, some 150 firms had been acquired. Singleton then essentially stopped direct acquisition of companies and began investments in stock of technical firms. By the end of the second decade, Teledyne owned 31% of Curtiss-Wright, 24% of Litton, as well as significant portions of a number of other well-known companies. This stock was mainly held by the insurance subsidiaries.

During the recession of the early 1970s, Teledyne stock fell from about $40 to less than $8. Singleton saw this as an opportunity to buy back Teledyne stock. In buybacks from October 1972 to February 1976, 22 million shares were repurchased at $14 to $40 – well above the market price. This raised the value of Teledyne stock, eventually increasing to near $175 at the end of the decade. In this period, annual income increased by 89% and net income by 315%. Stockholders who had remained through the buyback achieved a phenomenal gain of about 3,000%.

In a rare interview with Forbes, Singleton used a metaphor to describe this growth: “Teledyne is like a living plant, with our companies the different branches, each putting out new branches so that no one business is too significant.”

Entering its third decade, Teledyne sales passed the $3 billion mark in 1980, with industrial products leading in both sales and net income. In the race between the U.S. and the Soviet Union, government sales reached almost $800 million. Singleton made the first spin-off of a Teledyne operation in 1984. Teledyne Ecology had been involved in nuclear waste disposal, and some stockholders were concerned. He formed US Ecology, giving each stockholder one share for each seven Teledyne shares held, and allowing disposal of the new stock without reducing their Teledyne holdings. The first significant slump in Teledyne business began in 1985. Sales for 1984 had been about $3.49 billion, but decreased to around $3.26 billion the next year and remained essentially flat for the remainder of the decade.

At the annual meeting in April 1986, Singleton, who was then 69 years old, announced that he was turning the position of CEO over to Roberts, but was remaining as Board Chairman. During 1988, Teledyne faced a number of legal problems, none of which were the direct result of wrongdoings of Singleton or Roberts. After agreeing to plead guilty to making false statements, Teledyne was fined $17.5 million, but related lawsuits by “whistleblowers” ultimately cost $115 million in settlements.

In April 1989, Singleton, after guiding Teledyne for 29 years, retired as an employee and officer. Nevertheless, that was a peak year for Teledyne sales ($3.53 billion) and earnings ($392 million). Teledyne stock price reached $388.88, the highest in the US. Total employment also peaked at near 43,000.

Singleton retired as Teledyne Chairman in 1991, but remained on the Board. Roberts assumed the Chairman position, and relinquished direct management. Many companies had been sold during the prior several years, and in 1993, the number was further reduced from 65 to 21, primarily through consolidations. Beginning in late 1994, Teledyne was subjected to hostile takeovers attempts. Finally, on August 15, 1996, an agreement was reached to merge Teledyne with Allegheny Ludlum, a steel and specialty metals firm headquartered in Pittsburgh, Pennsylvania, and form Allegheny Teledyne, Inc. At that time, Singleton still owned 7.1% of the Teledyne stock. He retired from the Allegheny Teledyne Board in 1997.

In 1999, Allegheny Teledyne was split into three independent corporations, including Teledyne Technologies, that encompassed several of the older remaining companies.

== Rancher ==
Late in his life, Henry Singleton began investing in land. In the mid-1980s, Singleton started buying ranches in New Mexico and, later, California. Beginning with the acquisition of the 81,000-acre (33,000 ha) San Cristobal Ranch south of Santa Fe, in a relatively short time he had bought more than twenty ranches. Most were along the U.S. Route 285 corridor from Santa Fe to Roswell with others in San Miguel and Quay Counties, and the 30,000-acre (12,000 ha) Shepherd Ranch in Guadalupe County. Singleton was directly involved with the ranch operations as well as in efforts to preserve the many archaeological features on the land.

Within a 14-year period, Singleton purchased 28 other ranches, making the Singleton Ranches the largest cow-calf operation in New Mexico. Singleton's last acquisition was a 45,000-acre (18,000 ha) ranch in California. At the time of his death, he owned more than 1.5% of New Mexico. Managed by his children, Singleton Ranches owned 1,100,000 acres (4,500 km^{2}) in New Mexico and California, and was one of the nation's top cattle- and horse-breeding operations. The Singleton Family was ranked as the seventh largest land-holder in America in 2015. Stan Kroenke acquired most of the Singleton Ranches in 2025.

== Personal life ==
While at MIT, Singleton became active in science fiction fandom. He and a friend drove to Chicago to attend Chicon, the 2nd World Science Fiction Convention, and in November 1940 he published the first issue of Nepenthe, a fanzine focused on science fiction poetry. In its two issues, Nepenthe included work by A. Merritt, Donald A. Wollheim, Stanley G. Weinbaum, Robert A. W. Lowndes, John Christopher, Wilson Tucker, Russ Chauvenet, John B. Michel and Harry Warner, Jr.

Singleton had met the former Caroline Wood of Cambridge, Massachusetts, while he was first attending MIT, and they married in 1942. Throughout their years together, the Singletons commissioned two significant American architects for two notable houses. The first, designed by architect Richard Neutra in 1959, was the well known mid-century modern 'Singleton House' in the Los Angeles Bel Air area. The second house was designed by architect Wallace Neff in 1973; it was a large residence of French-Norman style in the Holmby Hills district of Los Angeles.

He was personally a primary financial backer ($320,800) of Apple Computer when it was incorporated in 1977. During his working years, Singleton served as a director of Apple Computer, Inc. (1977–1980); member of the MIT Corporation, the MIT Governing Board (1968–1973); trustee of California Institute of Technology (1968–1974); member of the U.S. Air Force Scientific Advisory Board (1959); and was a senior member of the Institute of Electrical and Electronics Engineers (IEEE). A financial and political conservative, Singleton was co-trustee of the blind trust for Ronald Reagan while Reagan was President of the United States.

For recreation, Singleton played tournament chess, collected wine, and hiked and camped in the wilderness areas of California. He could recite lengthy passages from Shakespeare and classical poetry. He studied Native American cultures and Western folklore.

Singleton spent much time to personal computers, programming algorithms and creating a computer version of backgammon specifically for Macintosh fans.

At 83 years of age, Henry Singleton, died of brain cancer on August 31, 1999, at his West Los Angeles home. He was survived by his wife of 53 years, Caroline, and five children. Caroline W. Singleton died in 2007. Their five children were James Singleton, John Singleton, William Singleton, Diana Singleton and Christina Singleton.

== Legacy ==
Henry Singleton established the Singleton Research Fellowship at the City of Hope Pilot Medical Center in 1970. He received the Outstanding Achievement Award in Business Management from the University of Southern California in 1972. His citation for membership in the National Academy of Engineering in 1979 read: “For his contributions to lightweight inertial navigation systems and his leadership in the creation of a major technological corporation.” While an undergraduate student at MIT, he was named a Putnam Fellow after his three-man team won the William Lowell Putnam Intercollegiate Mathematics Competition in 1939. Warren Buffett, one of the wealthiest men in the world, is quoted as saying that “Henry Singleton of Teledyne has the best operating and capital deployment record in American business".
