= Laura Starks =

American academic administrator

Laura T. Starks
- Years active: 1980s–present

Academic background
- Education: University of Texas at Austin (BBA, PhD)

Academic work
- Discipline: Finance, Investment management, ESG
- Institutions: McCombs School of Business
- Notable ideas: Research on mutual funds, institutional investors, and ESG investing

Laura T. Starks is an American academic economist.

Starks earned a bachelor's degree at the University of Texas at Austin, a master's of business administration at the University of Texas at San Antonio, and returned to UT-Austin for a doctorate. She was the Charles E. & Sarah M. Seay Regents’ Chair in Finance at the McCombs School of Business until her 2015 appointment as interim dean of the school. After Starks vacated the deanship, she was named George Kozmetsky Centennial University Distinguished Chair.

In 2022, Starks served as President of the American Finance Association. She has also served as President of the Financial Management Association (1998-1999) and the Western Finance Association (2015-2016). Starks has published influential articles concerning mutual funds, and served as an independent director of the TIAA-CREF mutual funds from 2006-2022. She was also a co-editor of the Review of Financial Studies from 2008-2014.
