= Servomechanisms Inc. =

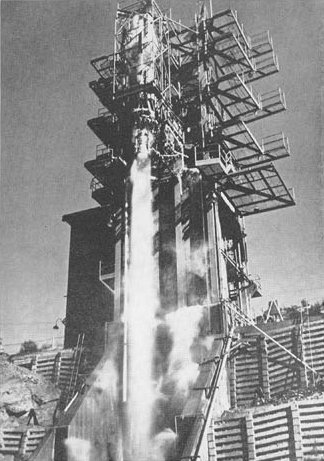
Servomechanisms, Inc. developed missile thrust control systems

Servomechanisms, Inc., was a Cold war era U.S. defense sub-contractor, which developed precision sub-systems for high performance jet aircraft, guided missiles and ballistic missiles. Most widely publicised was the company's role in development of the Army Redstone missile under the auspices of the Army Ballistic Missile Agency. 95% of the company's business was military-related. Company headquarters as well as its main production lines were located at 12500 Aviation Blvd., Hawthorne, California. In 1964, Teledyne Industries, Inc. purchased Servomechanisms, Inc., which became Teledyne Systems Company, Controls Systems Division, having its office relocated at 200 North Aviation Blvd., El Segundo, California.

== Structure ==
The company had several divisions, two of which were located at the West Coast of the United States, while three others at the East Coast, particularly

=== Goleta, California ===
- Research Division

=== Hawthorne, California ===
- Western Division
- Mechaponents Division

=== Westbury, Long Island ===
- Eastern Division
- Mechatrol Division

== Links ==
- Servomechanisms, Inc. corporate data
- Servomechanisms, Inc. advertisement - Analytical Chemistry (ACS Publications)
