= Spriegel =

Spriegel is a surname. Notable people with the surname include:

- Matthew Spriegel (born 1987), English cricketer
- William Spriegel (1893–1972), American automotive business executive, business theorist, and academic administrator

== See also ==
- Spiegel (surname)
