= PFTC =

PFTC may refer to:

- Primary fallopian tube cancer
- PFTC Sports Center, Las Vegas, Nevada, US; See Jean-Paul Mendy
- Putnam Fiduciary Trust Company; See 2003 mutual fund scandal
- Pacific Film and Television Commission, renamed Screen Queensland; See K-9
- Platform Functional Test Console; See LN-3 Inertial Navigation System
