= Teledyne Controls =

Avionic equipment company

Teledyne Controls is a business unit of Teledyne Technologies Incorporated (NYSE: TDY). Created in 1964, the company designs and manufactures onboard avionic and ground-based electronic systems for the aviation industry.

Teledyne Controls is headquartered in El Segundo (Los Angeles area), California, and has locations in the US and the UK, as well as sales offices in Toulouse, France; Seoul, Korea; Tokyo, Japan; Kuala Lumpur, Malaysia; Dubai, United Arab Emirates; Beijing and Shanghai, China; and Singapore.

== History ==
In 1964, Teledyne Industries, Inc. purchased Servomechanisms Inc., which became Teledyne Systems Company, Controls Systems Division, located in El Segundo, California. In 1971 the Controls Systems Division broke away from Teledyne Systems and became Teledyne Controls. In 1996, Teledyne Industries, Inc. merged with Allegheny Ludlum Steel forming a new corporation called Allegheny Teledyne, Inc. In 1999, Teledyne spun off from Allegheny and became Teledyne Technologies, Inc. Teledyne Controls is part of the Aerospace and Defense Electronics business segment.

== Core business ==
Teledyne Controls' core products aim at helping aircraft operators better access and manage their aircraft data. They are designed to record a multitude of data from sensors and equipment on board the aircraft, transfer the data from the aircraft to a ground based replay station, where it is processed and analyzed. The purpose is the early detection of any abnormal operation or potential issues in order to take proactive action to prevent incidents.

== Market segments ==
- Airline and cargo operators
- Aircraft manufacturers
- Business jet operators & owners
- Military / government operators
