= Lillian Mills =

American accountant and academic administrator

- Title: Dean of McCombs School of Business

Academic background
- Education: University of Florida

Lillian F. Mills is an American accountant and the first female dean of the University of Texas at Austin's McCombs School of Business.

Mills completed bachelor's and master's degrees in accounting at the University of Florida in 1980 and 1981, respectively, before moving to the University of Michigan to earn a doctorate in the subject, where she was advised by Joel Slemrod and published the dissertation Essays in Corporate Tax Compliance and Financial Reporting in 1996. She was a research fellow at the United States Department of the Treasury and worked as a certified public accountant for two firms from 1981 to 1989 before joining the University of Arizona faculty in 1997. She taught at UArizona until 2005, and accepted a teaching position at the University of Texas at Austin the following academic year.

At UTAustin, Mills held the Beverly H. and William P. O'Hara Chair in Business as well as the Lois and Richard Folger Dean's Leadership Chair. She became interim dean of the McCombs School of Business in April 2020, upon Jay Hartzell's elevation to interim president of the University of Texas at Austin. In June 2021, Mills was appointed to the deanship permanently, and is the first woman to serve in that position. Mill's lasting impact on the accounting profession will be "the influence she has had on generations of tax scholars."
