= Coffin Butte Landfill =

Landfill in Oregon, United States

Coordinates: 44°41′57″N 123°14′4″W

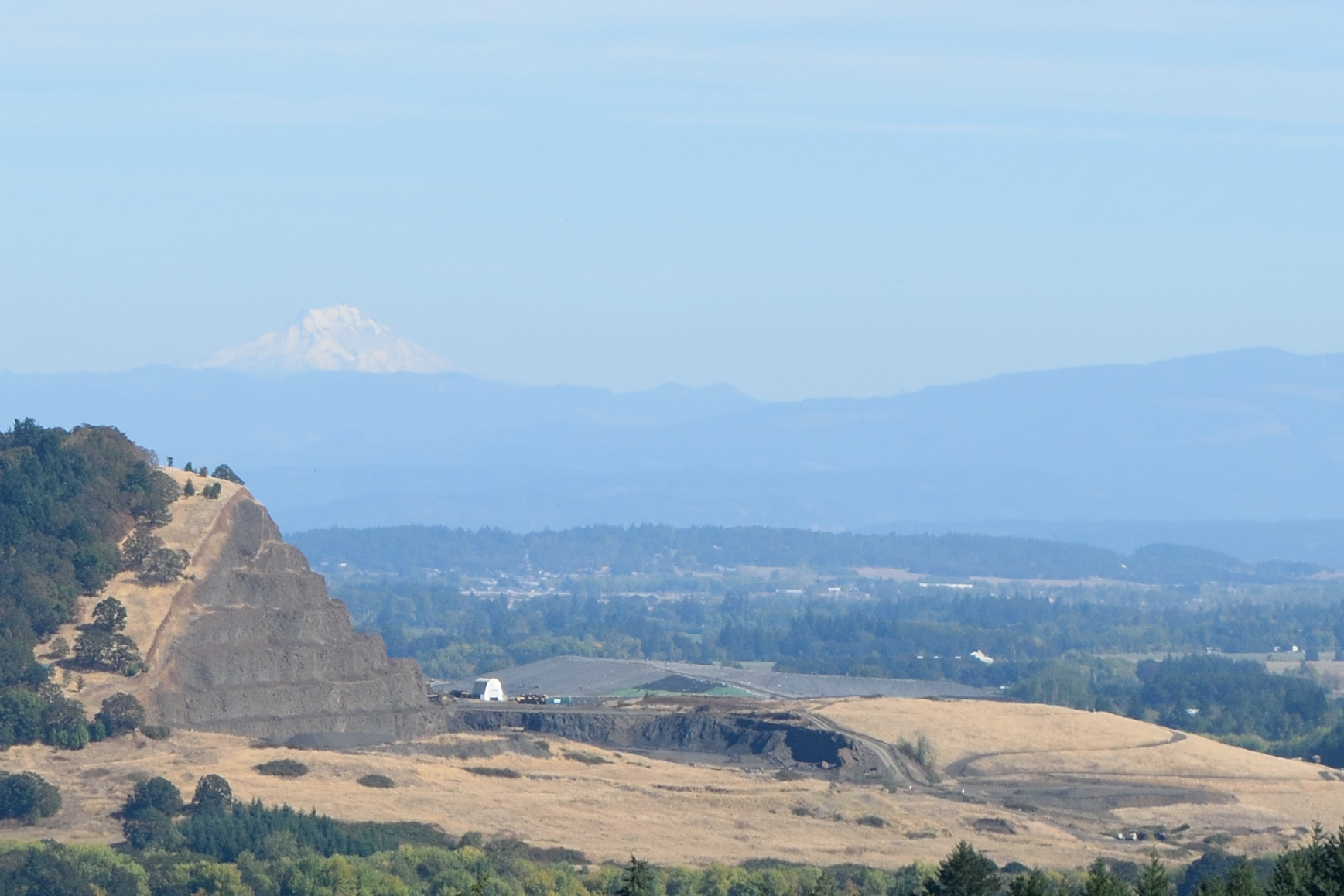
Coffin Butte Landfill

Coffin Butte Landfill is a regional waste disposal facility in Benton County, Oregon, United States, near Corvallis. Originally established in the 1940s as a burn site for Camp Adair, it expanded into a major landfill serving multiple counties by the 1980s, generating significant revenue for Benton County. The facility has faced environmental challenges, including contamination from radioactive industrial sludge and medical waste, groundwater pollution, and methane leaks, while ongoing expansion plans have generated local opposition.

== History ==
The site began as a waste and burn site for Camp Adair. In 1947 it was purchased and operated as a private business, Corvallis Disposal and Landfill. An incinerator operated on site from the 1940s through the 1960s. The site was expanded into a regional landfill in 1974, though access was still limited to nearby communities. In 1983 it began to accept waste from other counties after another site expansion; by 2021 only 12% of waste comes from the county. In 2022 the county received over $2 million from franchise fees for the operation, with a 1.1 million ton annual cap, and expected to receive $3.5 million in franchise fees by 2024.

The ownership changed to Allied Waste Industries in 2000, which was acquired by Republic Services in 2008.

The site is on former Camp Adair grounds. It is in the Soap Creek Valley, which feeds into the Luckiamute River, and is near the E. E. Wilson Wildlife Area. Knife River operates a quarry near the facility, and will eventually be part of the landfill.

== Environmental contamination ==
In the 1970s, Wah Chang Corporation dumped material containing volatile organic compounds, polycyclic aromatic hydrocarbons, polychlorinated biphenyls, chromium, thorium, zirconium, radium-226, radium-228 from their Millersburg zirconium plant, which eventually contaminated the Coffin Butte groundwater. It was discovered in 1976 that "huge amounts of radioactive industrial sludge" had been disposed of on agricultural fields and at the landfill. By 1982, 113,000 cubic yards of radioactive sludge remained on the Wah Chang plant site in Millersburg, in a pond only 400 feet from the Willamette River, containing volatile organic compounds, polycyclic aromatic hydrocarbons, polychlorinated biphenyls, chromium, thorium, zirconium, radium-226, radium-228.

Stericycle's Morton, Washington decontamination facility dumped medical waste at Coffin Butte, which led to concerns about mercury waste in 2003. It was estimated the Morton facility received over 50 pounds of mercury per year from King County, Washington alone.

Groundwater contamination of nearby properties was discovered, and the operator purchased surrounding properties beginning in the 1980s. During the 1996 Pacific Northwest floods the company had to pump leachate into the Willamette River on an emergency basis. A reverse osmosis leachate treatment facility was installed and operational by June 1998, but leachate is still trucked to Salem and Corvallis for treatment.

== Methane and energy ==
The site has used methane to generate power since at least 1994, when it could provide power to 1500 homes. By 2023 it was generating enough power for 4000 homes. The EPA found methane leaks in 2022 higher than the levels readable by instruments and in places that should be fully sealed. The DEQ's investigation noted the gas collection system was poorly monitored and inadequate for the size of the landfill, leading to fines and violations in 2025.

== Notable incidents ==
In 1999, contaminated soil from the New Carissa were disposed at the landfill.

A woman, murdered in 2023 and dismembered, was dumped at the landfill. Her body was found after an extensive search.

== Expansion plans ==
Since 2021 the company submitted plans for large expansions of the landfill onto property that they had committed to leave untouched in the 1970s and 1980s. Their expansion was denied in 2021 and again in July 2025, appealed and approved by the Benton County Board of Commissioners in November 2025. The board approved it with a 2–1 vote, and the commission chair tearfully said she was required to approve it based on her oath of office, stating "the landfill has not been in any way a good neighbor". It was appealed to the Oregon Land Use Board of Appeals, and in December 2025 the Benton County commissioners withdrew their approval. In March 2026 the board voted unanimously to reject the expansion.
