= ATI 425 Titanium Alloy =

Allegheny Technologies Incorporated (ATI)
- Industry: Aerospace; Defense; Industrial; Medical; Recreational
- Products: ATI 425 Titanium Alloy
- Website: atimetals.com

The ATI 425 Titanium Alloy is a titanium alloy developed and produced by Allegheny Technologies Incorporated (ATI).

It is produced in multiple product forms, including sheet, coil, strip, Precision Rolled Strip and foil, plate, seamless tube, shapes and rectangles, as well as castings.

The ATI 425 Titanium Alloy was debuted on June 14, 2010 at the land and air-land defense and security exhibition Eurosatory in Paris, France.

== Composition ==
	Al	Va	Fe	O	C	N	H	Ti	Remainder Each	Remainder Total
Min	3.5	2.0	1.2	0.2	--	--	--	Balance	--	--
Max	4.5	3.0	1.8	0.30	0.08	0.03	0.015	Balance	0.10	0.30

See

== Applications ==
Markets for ATI 425 Alloy include aerospace, defense, industrial, medical and recreation. The corrosion resistance of the ATI 425 Alloy to saltwater environments also makes it a candidate for marine-related applications.

Specifically, the ATI 425 Alloy is designed for:

- Wing sheets
- Defense rotor aircraft
- Ground vehicles
- Soldier support and protection
- Weapons systems
- Naval systems
- Boiler/pressure vessel applications
- Additional naval applications, including shiphold structural materials; armor; doors, hatches and bulkheads; and piping
- Golf clubs (Titleist TSI)

The ATI 425 Alloy was used on the Phoenix Mars Lander, which was launched on August 4, 2007.

== Availability ==
The ATI 425 Alloy currently is available in the following forms:

Cold-rolled coil	Bar	High-performance plate
36" width 1-meter width 48" width	1.0″, 2.0″, 3.25″ round bar 0.25″, 0.344″, 0.5″ round coil 1.44″ × 3.0″ rectangle U-channel shape	Thicknesses ranging from 0.25 to 2.1 inches

== Certifications ==
The ATI 425 Alloy sheet is processed to the AMS 6946 specification.

The ASME Board on Pressure Technology Codes and Standards (BPTCS) has approved ATI 425 Alloy for use in Section VIII, Div. 1 construction up to 600 °F (316 °C).

The ATI 425 Alloy has been assigned a titanium grade 38 by ASTM International. It can be welded using ERTi-38 weld wire, which is produced in accordance with AWS 5.16/A5.16M.
