= Richard P. Simmons =

American metallurgist, industrialist and philanthropist (1931–2026)

Richard P. Simmons (May 3, 1931 – April 23, 2026) was an American metallurgist, industrialist and philanthropist.

== Life and career ==
Simmons was born on May 3, 1931. He attended the Massachusetts Institute of Technology (MIT) beginning in 1949. He became a metallurgist at the Allegheny Ludlum Steel corporation in Pittsburgh in 1953. After working for several other steel companies, he returned to Allegheny Ludlum in 1968, becoming chief executive in 1972. During his tenure, he took the company public and led a management buyout. Simmons was Chief Executive Officer and Chairman until 1990, when he became chairman.

In addition to Allegheny Ludlum, Simmons was a Director, Trustee, and Trustee Emeritus for institutions including: MIT, PNC Financial Services, Pittsburgh National Bank, US Airways, Sewickley Valley Hospital, the United Way of Southwestern Pennsylvania, and the University of Pittsburgh.

He created a variety of endowments at MIT and contributed $7 million for the Dorothy P. and Richard P. Simmons Center for Interstitial Lung Disease at the University of Pittsburgh Medical Center, which was established in honor of Simmons’s first wife, who died in 2001.

Simmons chaired the Pittsburgh Symphony Orchestra's Board of Directors between 1989 and 1997, returning as Chairman again from 2003 until 2015. In 2025, the Pittsburgh Symphony renamed Heinz Hall's stage as the Simmons Family Stage, honoring more than $50 million in lifetime contributions from Simmons and his family.

Simmons died in his sleep on April 23, 2026, at the age of 94.
