= Kemper Corporation =

American insurance provider

- Company type: Public
- Traded as: NYSE: KMPR; S&P 600 component
- Industry: Insurance
- Founded: 1990; 36 years ago
- Headquarters: Chicago, Illinois, U.S.
- Key people: Stephen J. McAnena (CEO)
- Revenue: ▲US$5,206 million (2020)
- Operating income: ▲US$510.1 million (2020)
- Net income: ▲US$409.9 million (2020)
- Total assets: ▲US$14,342 million (2020)
- Number of employees: 10,000 (2021)
- Website: kemper.com

Kemper Corporation is an American insurance provider with corporate headquarters located in Chicago, Illinois. With nearly $13 billion in assets, the Kemper family of companies provides insurance to individuals, families, and businesses.

== History ==
Kemper Corporation was originally founded as Unitrin, Inc. in April 1990, when it spun off from Henry Singleton's conglomerate Teledyne. Singleton expected the new venture to duplicate the successful spin off of the Argo Group, originally a workers’ compensation insurance provider, created in 1986. Argonaut's original $20 per share stock appreciated 240 percent by 1990. Singleton remained Chairman of Unitrin after it was spun off to shareholders at $31.25 per share, trading on NASDAQ. Unitrin divided its business into three major categories: life and health insurance, property and casualty insurance, and consumer finance, which covered a variety of services including automobile and industrial loans.

In 2002, Unitrin purchased the renewal rights for the homeowners and automobile insurance lines of Kemper Insurance, a long-time Chicago insurance and financial services firm.

In 2010, Unitrin purchased all rights to the Kemper name, and began operations as Kemper Corporation on August 25, 2011, with trading on the New York Stock Exchange under the KMPR ticker symbol.

In November 2015, Joseph P. Lacher, Jr. was appointed President and Chief Executive Officer.

The company unified and refreshed its brand in October 2018.

Fortune Magazine included Kemper on its 2020 list of the 100 fastest-growing companies.

On November 23, 2020, the company announced it had entered into a definitive agreement to acquire American Access Casualty Company and its related captive insurance agency, Newins Insurance Agency Holdings, LLC, and its subsidiaries (collectively “AAC”), in a cash transaction valued at $370 million. On April 1, 2021, the company announced it had completed the acquisition of AAC. AAC provided specialty private passenger auto insurance in Arizona, Illinois, Indiana, Nevada and Texas.

The Kemper Open was a professional golf tournament on the PGA Tour for 35 years, from 1968 through 2002.

== Acquisitions ==
In April 2015, Kemper acquired Alliance United Insurance Company, one of the fastest growing auto insurance providers in the State of California. Source:

In July 2018, Kemper acquired Infinity Property and Casualty Corporation (NASDAQ: IPCC), an auto insurance provider focused on serving the specialty, nonstandard segment, in a cash and stock transaction valued at approximately $1.4 billion.

In April 2021, Kemper completed the acquisition of Downers Grove, Illinois based American Access Casualty Company. American Access Casualty Company specializes in automobile insurance directed towards the Hispanic community.

== Subsidiaries ==
=== Kemper Property & Casualty ===
Kemper’s Property & Casualty Insurance segment includes the following businesses:

- Kemper Auto, a national provider of auto insurance with a concentration on non-standard auto insurance
- Infinity, a provider of non-standard auto insurance for drivers in the State of California only
- Kemper Personal Insurance, which provides both home and auto insurance to the company’s preferred/standard book of business

=== Property & Casualty Insurance Companies ===
- Alpha Property & Casualty Insurance Company
- Alliance United Insurance Company
- Charter Indemnity Company
- Financial Indemnity Company
- Infinity Insurance Company
- Infinity Auto Insurance Company
- Infinity Assurance Insurance Company
- Infinity Casualty Insurance Company
- Infinity County Mutual Insurance Company
- Infinity Indemnity Insurance Company
- Infinity Preferred Insurance Company
- Infinity Safeguard Insurance Company
- Infinity Select Insurance Company
- Infinity Standard Insurance Company
- Infinity Security Insurance Company
- Kemper Financial Indemnity Company
- Kemper Independence Insurance
- Merastar Insurance Company
- Mutual Savings Fire Insurance Company
- Response Insurance Company
- Response Worldwide Direct Auto Insurance Company
- Response Worldwide Insurance Company
- Trinity Universal Insurance Company
- Unitrin Advantage Insurance Company
- Unitrin Auto and Home Insurance Company
- Unitrin Direct Insurance Company
- Unitrin Direct Property & Casualty Company
- Unitrin Preferred Insurance Company
- Unitrin Safeguard Insurance Company
- Valley Property & Casualty Insurance Company
- Warner Insurance Company

=== Kemper Life & Kemper Health ===
Kemper’s Life & Health insurance segment is made up of the following businesses:

- Kemper Life

=== Life & Health Insurance Companies ===
- Mutual Savings Fire Insurance Company
- Mutual Savings Life Insurance Company
- Reserve National Insurance Company
- The Reliable Life Insurance Company
- Union National Life Insurance Company research department
- United Insurance Company of America
- United Casualty Insurance Company of America
- Union National Fire Insurance Company

=== Other Affiliated Insurance Companies ===
- Capitol County Mutual Fire Insurance Company
- Old Reliable Casualty Company
- Unitrin County Mutual Insurance Company

== See also ==
- Genworth Financial
