= George Gau =

American academic administrator (1947–2019)

George William Gau (1947–2019) was an American academic administrator.

Gau was born in St. Louis in 1947, and raised in Edwardsville, Illinois, alongside a younger sister, Joyce. Upon graduating from Edwardsville High School in 1965, Gau enrolled at the University of Illinois at Urbana–Champaign, where he earned his bachelor's, master's, and doctoral degrees. Gau joined the faculty of the University of Oklahoma, and later taught at the University of British Columbia, where he led the Urban Economics Division. In 1986, he was elected president of the American Real Estate and Urban Economics Association. He returned to the United States in 1988, as professor at the University of Texas at Austin. Gau became chair of finance in 1992. While affiliated with the McCombs School of Business, Gau held the George S. Watson Centennial Professorship in Real Estate and the J. Ludwig Mosle Centennial Memorial Professorship in Investments and Money Management. From 2002 to 2008, Gau was the ninth person to serve as dean of the McCombs School of Business. He died on December 23, 2019, of glioblastoma.
