= BlueView Technologies =

American electrical equipment company

BlueView Technologies, Inc
- Type: Subsidiary
- Founder: Lee Thompson, Jason Seawall, and Scott Bachelor
- Headquarters: Seattle, Washington, U.S.
- Key people: Lee Thompson (Founder) Jason Seawall (Founder) Scott Bachelor (President)
- Parent: Teledyne Technologies
- Website: www.teledynemarine.com/brands/blueview

BlueView Technologies, Inc is an American electrical equipment company based in Seattle, Washington that designs, develops and sells advanced Sonar Systems that can be currently deployed on AUV's, ROV's, surface vessels, fixed positions, and portable platforms. The company provides products for the Navy, Coast Guard, and port authorities, among other law-enforcing marine centric organisations, the necessary facilities to see underwater.

BlueView was founded in 2005 by Lee Thompson, Jason Seawall, and Scott Bachelor. It was acquired by Teledyne Technologies in 2012.
