= McCombs School of Business =

Business school at The University of Texas at Austin

- Former names: School of Business Administration (1922–1945); College of Business Administration (1945–2000)
- Type: Public business school
- Established: 1922
- Parent institution: University of Texas at Austin
- Endowment: $272.9 million (2015)
- Dean: Bradley Staats
- Faculty: 205
- Students: 12,937
- Location: Austin, Texas, U.S. 30.284240°N 97.738066°W
- Campus: Urban
- Colors: Burnt Orange
- Website: mccombs.utexas.edu

The McCombs School of Business (McCombs School or McCombs) is the business school at the University of Texas at Austin, a public research university in Austin, Texas.

In addition to the main campus in Downtown Austin, McCombs offers classes outside Central Texas in Dallas, and Houston. The McCombs School of Business offers undergraduate, master's, and doctoral programs for their average 13,000 students each year, adding to its 98,648 member alumni base from a variety of business fields. In addition to traditional classroom degree programs, McCombs is home to 14 collaborative research centers, the international business plan competition: Venture Labs Investment Competition (formerly known as "MOOT Corp"), and executive education programs.

McCombs is also the oldest public business school in Texas.

== History ==
When the Business-Economics Building opened in 1962, it was the largest classroom structure on campus

The University of Texas at Austin (UT Austin) was founded in 1883, and the university's School of Business Administration was established a few decades later in 1922. The school quickly grew, establishing a Master in Professional Accounting program in 1948 and offering its first executive education programs in 1955.

Effects of the 1990s technology boom and dot-com bubble were palpable in Austin, leaving the nickname "Silicon Hills" on the city. One McCombs School program that has capitalized on this is the Venture Labs Investment Competition, which is the oldest operating inter-business school new-venture competition in the world. Begun in 1984, it has been dubbed the "Super Bowl of world business plan competitions." Also opportunistic was the creation of the school's first Management Information Systems degree in 1990. The MBA Investment Fund, LLC was also founded in 1994, becoming the first legally constituted investment fund run by Master of Business Administration (MBA) students and proving quite successful, with a 17.5 percent annual return to date. Additionally, in 1995 the college became the first to require students have an e-mail address.

On May 11, 2000, an auto dealership owner Red McCombs announced a $50 million donation to UT Austin. In his honor, the College of Business Administration and the Graduate School of Business were merged under the newly created Red McCombs School of Business.

In June 2007, AT&T pledged $25 million to the McCombs School towards the construction of the Executive Education and Conference Center. As part of the financial contribution, the center, which opened August 2008, will be named the AT&T Executive Education and Conference Center for the next 25 years.

== Facilities ==
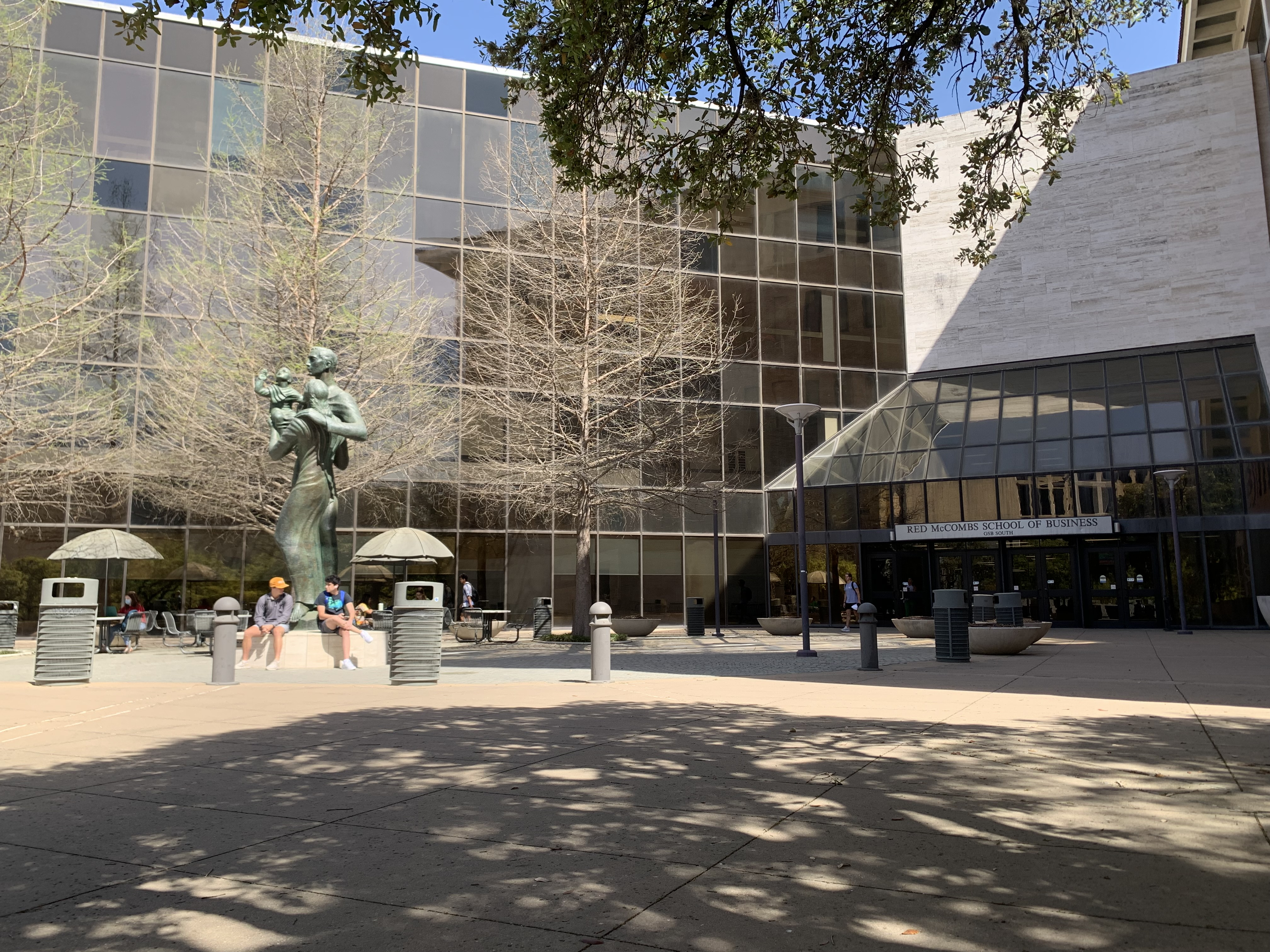
Old Graduate School of Business Building (It is now currently the undergraduate school of business)

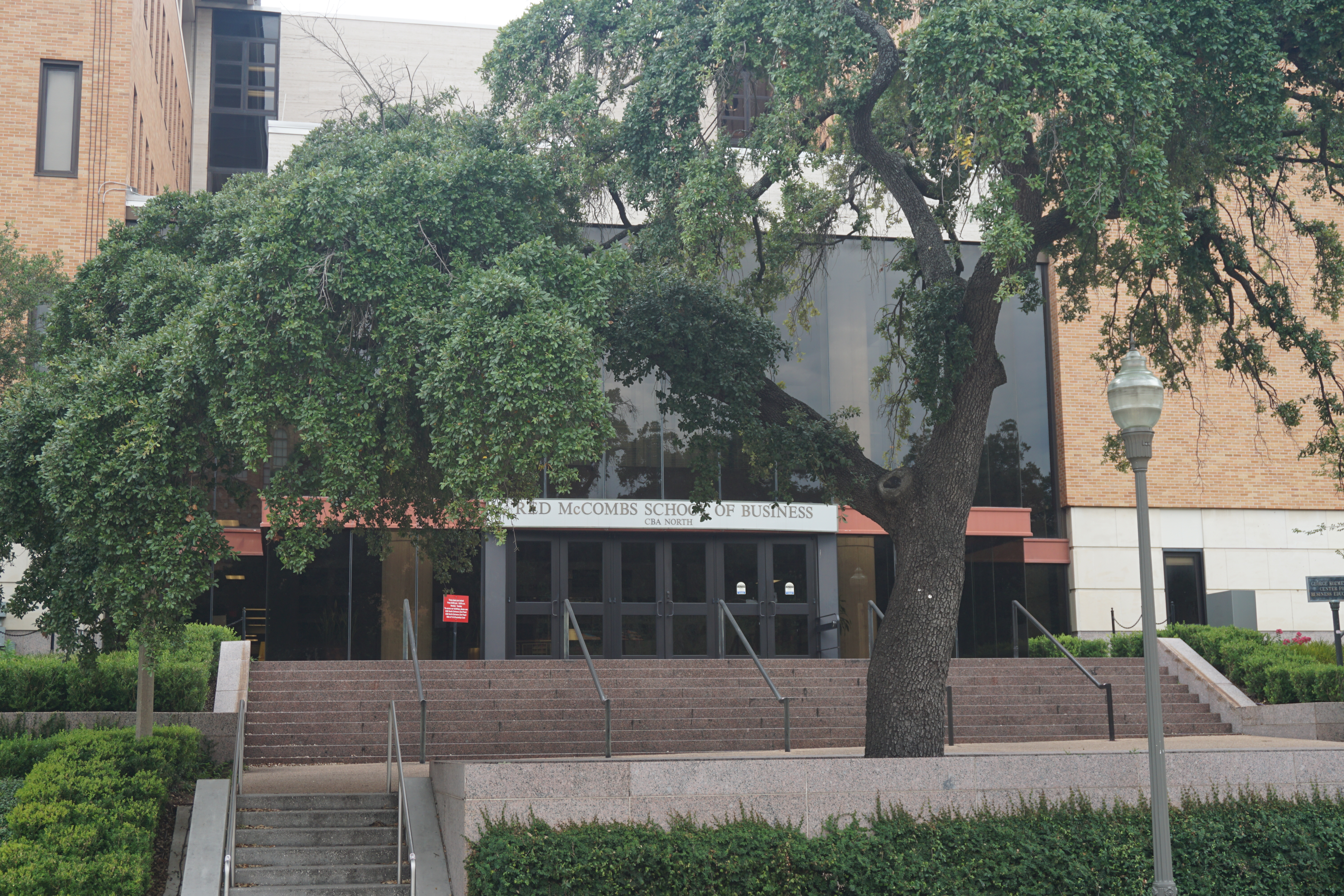
Another view of the undergraduate Business Administration building

The McCombs School of Business is located in the heart of the University of Texas at Austin campus. The majority of the McCombs School is housed in a three-building complex called the George Kozmetsky Center for Business Education, named after philanthropist and former College of Business Administration dean, George Kozmetsky, at the intersection of 21st and Speedway Streets. The McCombs School is bordered by Waggener Hall (the former home of the College of Business Administration) to the North, Gregory Gymnasium, and E. P. Schoch Building (one of the last overseen by campus master planner Paul Cret) to the East and is adjacent to Perry–Castañeda Library to the south.

The Business-Economics Building (now the College of Business Administration Building), opened in January 1962. It was the largest classroom structure on campus when it was built and housed the first escalator on campus. Today, it is home to the undergraduate programs at the McCombs School and the Bureau of Business Research. The building faces Speedway Street and unlike the majority of surrounding Mediterranean Revival Style architecture structures, most of the building is faced with brick.

In March 1976, the Graduate School of Business Building opened next to the existing building facing 21st Street. Since its inception, the addition to the College of Business Administration Building houses the separate graduate MBA program. The addition was constructed in a rhombus shape to protect a grove of trees on the north side of the building.

Located on the southwest corner of the UT campus, the AT&T Executive Education and Conference Center is a multi-function complex and hotel. The facility has multiple sized classrooms and breakout rooms, a 300-seat amphitheater, ballroom, three restaurants, and 297 hotel rooms. The center hosts all of the executive education programs for the McCombs School, including the Texas Executive Education and evening MBA programs. It is the first building to be built to the U.S. Green Building Council's LEED Silver certification standards on campus.

A statue titled "The Family Group" by sculptor, and former UT College of Fine Arts professor, Charles Umlauf sits in the middle of McCombs Plaza at the southern entrance of the GSB Building.

In August 2012, the University of Texas System Board of Regents approved a proposal for a new $155 million, 458,000-square-foot Graduate Business Education Center to serve MBA, M.S., and upper-level undergraduate courses. Located across from the AT&T Executive Education and Conference Center, the new state-of-the-art building opened in March 2018. This facility is called Robert B. Rowling Hall. Rowling Hall was completed in early 2018 and features five above ground floors and six below ground floors for parking. The building was designed by Jacobs and Ennead Architects.

== Academics ==
Business school rankings

U.S. MBA Rankings
- Bloomberg (2025): 21

McCombs is made up of a total of 6,548 students (Fall 2018): 4,752 undergraduates, 1,702 postgraduate, and 94 doctoral students. An additional 6,450 undergraduates take coursework through the Texas Business Foundations Program (Texas BFP), described below, for a total enrollment of 12,998. All undergraduates classes are at the main campus in Austin while almost a fifth of postgraduate student classes are held outside of Central Texas in Dallas, Houston, and Mexico City.

In addition to traditional graduation routes, McCombs offers a five-year program where students earn their BBA and Master in Professional Accounting (MPA) degrees concurrently. The Texas BFP offers non-business majors the opportunity to grasp the fundamentals of business operations and minor in business while pursuing any undergraduate program at the University of Texas at Austin. Students in the Business Foundations Program take seven business courses (two lower-division and five upper-division) in addition to their existing undergraduate course work. Students who complete the program are capable of integrating their minor into their future career.

=== Admissions ===
In Fall 2018, out of the 8,034 freshman applicants, 1,835 were admitted to the undergraduate program. Unlike most colleges & schools at the University of Texas at Austin and the university itself, McCombs does not accept spring or summer applications. Prospective students must apply for admission only during the fall semester. Both undergraduate and postgraduate applicants have similar admissions requirements. Applicants are evaluated holistically based on letters of recommendation, essays, transcripts, and a resume. MBA applicants however are encouraged to have at least two years of full-time work experience and are required to take the Graduate Management Admission Test (GMAT). For Fall 2018, the McCombs school received just over 2,000 applications for the Full-Time MBA program whose class size is 284.

=== Organization ===
The McCombs School of Business awards the degrees of Bachelor of Business Administration (BBA), Master of Business Administration (MBA), Master in Professional Accounting (MPA), Masters of Science in Marketing (MSM), Master of Science in Business Analytics (MSBA), Master of Science in Finance (MSF), Master of Science in Information Technology and Management (MSITM), Master of Science in Technology Commercialization (MSTC), Doctorate of Philosophy (PhD), as well as certificates upon completion of non-degreed Executive Education programs. Programs awarding doctoral degrees at the McCombs School of Business are divided in five academic departments, Accounting, Finance, Information, Risk, and Operations Management (IROM), Management, and Marketing. A sixth department, Business, Government and Society, was created in 2010 and does not award a doctoral degree.

=== Canfield Business Honors Program (Canfield BHP) ===
Admission is based on high school class rank along with extracurricular activities, and is typically only offered to students in the top 2% of their graduating class. Canfield BHP courses are taught by some of the McCombs School's most experienced faculty. Emphasis is placed on class discussion and presentations, case study analysis, and the research of actual business decisions. Enrollment in Canfield BHP classes is restricted to students in the program, and has small class sizes (generally 30-45 students). Canfield BHP also has a sophomore transfer application for first-year students that want to transfer into the Canfield Business Honors Program the following year.

=== Research ===
McCombs is home to over a dozen collaborative research centers focused on various business and investment sectors. Research centers are part of the academic departments and research information within that department according to the center's specialty.

== People ==
=== Alumni ===
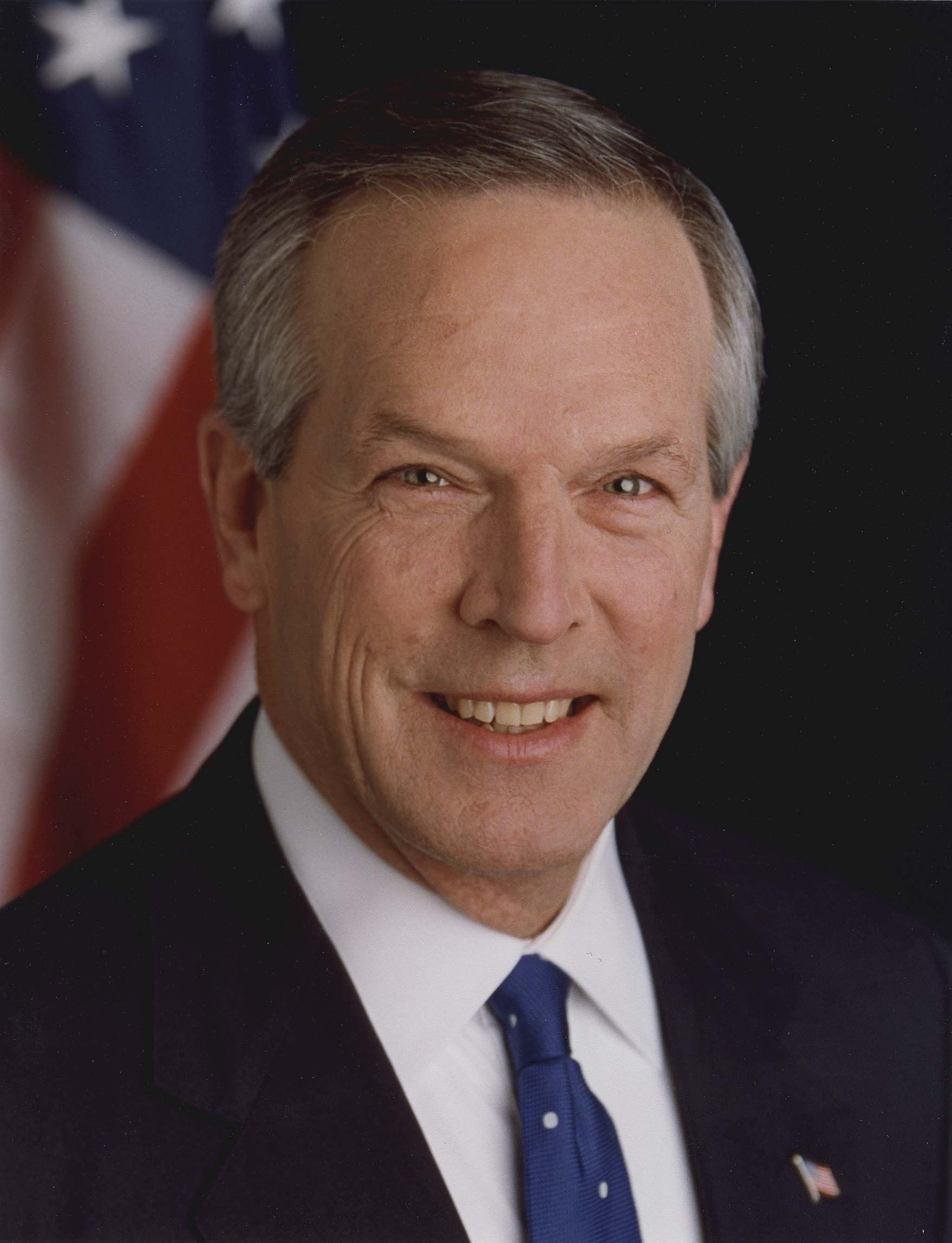
Donald Evans, former U.S. Secretary of Commerce under George W. Bush, received an MBA from McCombs in 1974.

Graduates from McCombs receive competitive salaries and are solicited by some of the best companies in the world. Furthermore, McCombs has continued to maintain a high job placement for its graduates due to the Texas economy and job market. Top recruiters at McCombs historically include PriceWaterhouseCoopers, Ernst & Young, Deloitte, KPMG, Bank of America Merrill Lynch, JP Morgan Chase, Credit Suisse, Dell, Citigroup, Boston Consulting Group, Microsoft, Chevron, and BP.

Alumni of the business school include:

- Benchmark venture capitalist Bill Gurley '93
- Texas Governor Greg Abbott '81
- Southwest Airlines CEO Gary C. Kelly '74
- Heinz CEO William R. Johnson '74
- Former Texas Rangers owner Thomas O. Hicks '68
- ConocoPhillips CEO James Mulva (BBA) '68 & (MBA) '69
- National Oilwell Varco CEO Clay C. Williams
- Donald Evans '73, former U.S. Secretary of Commerce
- Kovid Gupta '10, author
- The school's namesake, Red McCombs, also attended the business school, going on to co-found Clear Channel Communications and co-own the San Antonio Spurs, the Denver Nuggets, and the Minnesota Vikings.

=== Faculty ===
As of the 2015–2016 school year, the McCombs School employs 192 full-time equivalent faculty. Bradley Staats succeeded Lillian Mills as dean in July 2026. Lillian Mills, who had served as dean since 2020, returned to the Shulkin Department of Accounting as a distinguished faculty member.

=== List of deans ===
- Spurgeon Bell (1922–1925)
- E. Karl McGinnis (1925–1926)
- J. Anderson Fitzgerald (1926–1950)
- William Spriegel (1950–1958)
- John Arch White (1958–1966)
- George Kozmetsky (1966–1982)
- William H. Cunningham (1983–1985)
- Robert Witt (1985–1994)
- Robert May (1995–2002)
- George Gau (2002–2008)
- Thomas W. Gilligan (2008–2015)
- Laura Starks (2015–2016)
- Jay Hartzell (2016–2020)
- Lillian Mills (2020-2026)
- Bradley Staats (since 2026)

List

== See also ==
- List of United States business school rankings
- List of business schools in the United States
