= William Spriegel =

American business theorist (1893–1972)

William Robert Spriegel (14 May 1893 – 28 August 1972) was an American automotive businessman, educator, and academic administrator specializing in the study of personnel management.

== Early life and business career ==
Spriegel was born to parents John William Spriegel and Mary M. Lynn on 14 May 1893 and was raised in Charleston, West Virginia. He attended Lebanon Valley College, earning his first bachelor's degree in economics, Greek, Latin, and philosophy in 1914, followed by a second bachelor's degree in chemistry, physics, and mathematics in 1915. Spriegel served in World War I as an aviator and test pilot. He returned to school after concluding his military service, enrolling at the University of Michigan to earn a master's degree in psychology in 1920 and a doctoral degree in economics in 1935. In the period between the completion of his graduate degrees, Spriegel pursued a career in education and later business, serving two years as school superintendent in Waynesville, Ohio, and working successively in management roles for the United States Rubber Company, Dodge Brothers, Fisher Body Corporation, and the Charles A. Strelinger Company in Detroit.

== Academia ==
Spriegel returned to academia with a two-year tenure as an assistant professor at the University of Michigan School of Business Administration. He then taught at the Western Kentucky State Teachers College from 1934 to 1937, when he moved to Northwestern University. From 1939, Spriegel was chair of management studies at Northwestern. In 1942, he was appointed to the National War Labor Board. Spriegel relocated to Texas in 1948, as professor and associate dean of the University of Texas at Austin College of Business Administration. He was elevated to the deanship in 1950 and served through 1958. Spriegel resigned the position after eight years, though he chose to remain on the faculty through 1966. During Spriegel's administrative tenure, the Texas House of Representatives honored him with a legislative resolution in 1953. As Waggener Hall became increasingly crowded, Spriegel advocated for a new building to house the business school, and funding for the construction of the Business Economics Building was approved near the end of his stint as dean. Spriegel was active in several professional organizations as an executive. He served as vice president and president of the American Academy of Management in the 1950s. Additionally, Spriegel represented the United States on the International Management Congress in 1953 and 1957, and also chaired the Texas Personnel and Management Association.

== Personal life ==
Spriegel married Gladys Maree Strelinger on 6 August 1918. The couple raised two children. He was a Presbyterian and politically affiliated with the Democratic Party. Spriegel died in Austin, Texas, on 28 August 1972, and was buried in Roseland Park in Berkley, Michigan.

== Selected publications ==
- Spriegel, William; Shulz, Edward (1956). Elements of Supervision. John Wiley & Sons.
- Gilbreth, Frank; Lillian Gilbreth (1953). William R. Spriegel; Clark E. Myers (eds.). The Writings of the Gilbreths. Homewood, Illinois: Richard D. Irwin.
- Spriegel, William; Towle, Joseph W. (1951). Retail Personnel Management. McGraw-Hill.
- Spriegel, William; Davies, E. C. (1946). Principles of Business Organization. Prentice-Hall.
