= LN-3 inertial navigation system =

Military aircraft equipment

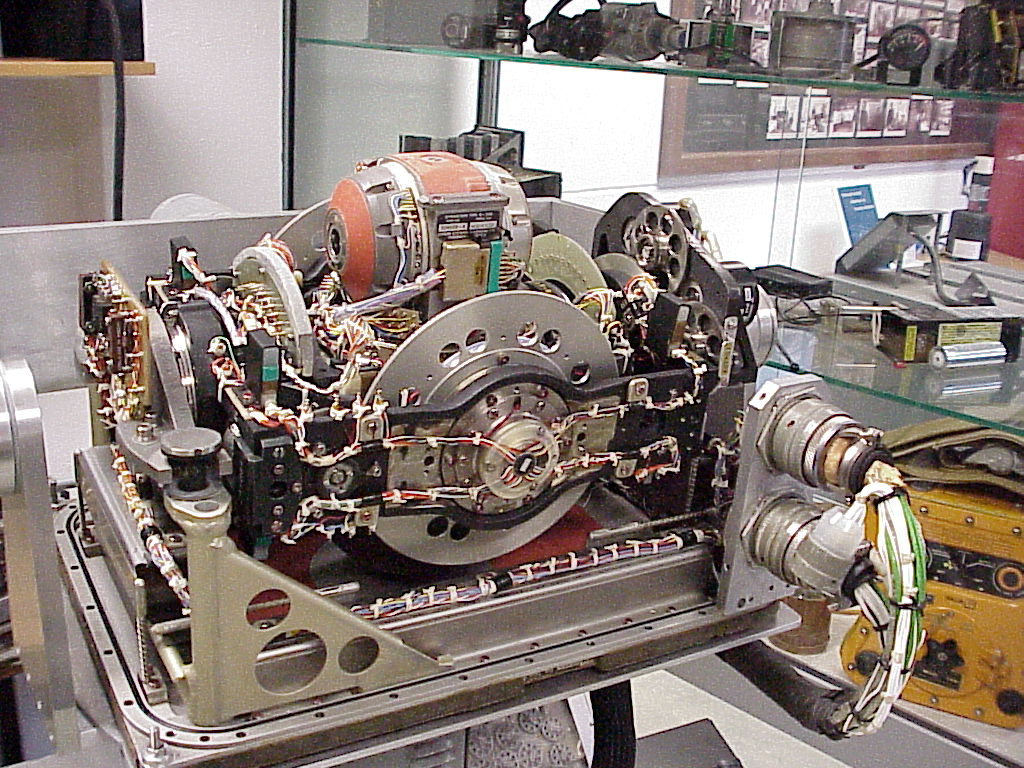
LN3-2A Inertial Platform at RNlAF Electronics Museum, Rhenen, The Netherlands.

The LN-3 inertial navigation system is an inertial navigation system (INS) that was developed in the 1960s by Litton Industries. It equipped the Lockheed F-104 Starfighter versions used as strike aircraft in European forces. An inertial navigation system is a system which continually determines the position of a vehicle from measurements made entirely within the vehicle using sensitive instruments. These instruments are accelerometers which detect and measure vehicle accelerations, and gyroscopes which act to hold the accelerometers in proper orientation.

== Background ==
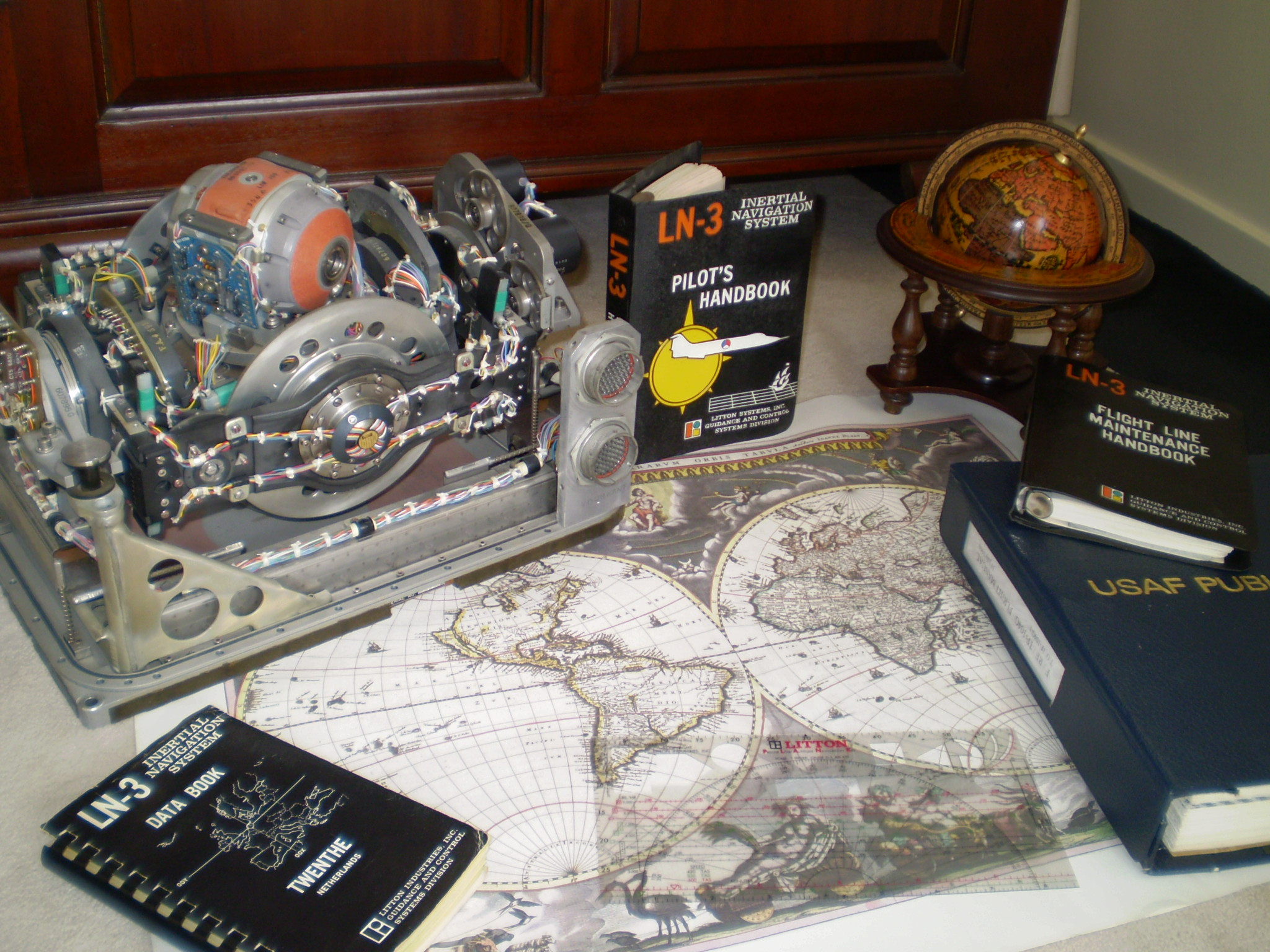
LN3-2A Platform in historic environment

The development of Litton's first INS was the result of a collusive act by the engineer, Max Lipscomb of the Wright Air Force Base in Ohio and Dr. Henry E. Singleton, Head of the newly formed Guidance and Control Dept. of Litton Industries at Beverly Hills, California.

Lipscomb's department was not permitted to engage in development of navigation systems, but was permitted to engage in other aircraft avionics such as pitch, roll, and yaw indicators. Singleton proposed to provide a system that would provide highly accurate pitch, roll, and yaw indicators. The system would be a north seeking stable platform controlled by gyroscopes and accelerometers. Such a system would automatically provide velocities in the east–west and north–south direction. And later, by providing integrators for these two axes, one would then have a full-fledged Inertial Navigation System.

In about mid-1956 a contract for approximately $300,000 was awarded by Wright Air Force Base to Litton Industries for the development of such "Aircraft Attitude System." Singleton appointed Sidney Shapiro as Project Engineer for this program. The system was completed and ready for flight test by the end of 1958.

Mr. Shapiro selected Paul Mantz, a partner in Tallmantz Aviation, to supply the aircraft, principally because of Mantz's extensive experience with the movie industry. They had done their work on several Cinerama travelogs. Mantz's people had also recently finished work on the picture "North by Northwest" starring Cary Grant in which there was considerable stunt flying. Shapiro's idea was to photograph the ground periodically and at the same instant to photograph the Inertial Navigation System's output. In that way no possibility of finger pointing was possible since none of Shapiro's people were involved in the data taking. So the two extra integrators were installed and the system was ready for test by early 1959.

By 1959 things had gone well enough that Shapiro was able to obtain three successive flights in which the accuracies were substantially better than one mile an hour. On the basis of these results, Litton Industries was awarded a contract to provide 2000 systems for the F104 NATO Fighter Aircraft.

The Cold War missile race spurred the development of smaller, lighter and more accurate inertial systems. Independent of its environment, the inertial system provides velocity and position information accurately and instantaneously for all manoeuvres, as well as being an accurate attitude and heading reference. The LN3-2A was the first inertial navigation system small and light and accurate enough to be fitted in a high performance fighter.

The early F-104's, model A through F, did not have an Inertial Navigator. It was the development of the F-104G, around 1959, for the European Air Forces with tactical bomber/strike capabilities, that brought the LN-3 into the aircraft. The LN-3 gave the F-104G the capability to navigate at low level in adverse weather and to drop a nuclear weapon at a range of 1,000 km with the best possible precision; this being vital to the F-104G program.

The LN-3 is a full 3-degrees-of-freedom, 4-gimbal inertial navigator, covering the flight performance envelope of the F-104G which ranged from 0 to 70,000 feet altitude; 0 to Mach 2+ speed, and accelerations from −5 to +9 g.

== Functional description ==
The functional description of the LN3-2A requires some knowledge of some basic principles of inertial navigation to understand their application to the LN3-2A. The principal component of the system is the stable platform to which are mounted three accelerometers and two gyros. This stable platform is mounted in a system of platform gimbals. The acceleration of the airplane in any plane or direction is measured by the accelerometers and integrated in the computer to obtain velocity. Velocities in turn are integrated to obtain distance. With a known reference point representing initial position of the airplane with respect to Earth, this data can be converted to distance and heading traveled, and distance and bearing to destination.

=== Platform ===
The following characteristics of the platform are described:

1. Three accelerometers in orthogonal directions provide the basic sensing elements. They measure acceleration along the two grid coordinate axes and the vertical (Z) axis. The Z accelerometer is not used by the LN3-2A itself but provides vertical acceleration data for the automatic flight control system. The east–west and north-south X and Y axes are used for the LN3-2A. The accelerometer outputs torque the gyros in their sensitive axes, while the airplane is in flight, to maintain earth and grid north orientation of the stable platform through the platform gimbals.
2. Two gyros stabilize the stable platform and provide for various compensations to be introduced, keeping the stable platform level with respect to Earth instead of inertial space, and providing a coordinate reference system of three axes. The gyros each have two degrees of freedom, and are oriented so that the spin axes are 90 degrees apart. The upper gyro has its spin axis oriented along the north–south grid coordinate axis and is sensitive to torques (airplane rotations) about the east–west and vertical coordinate axes. The lower gyro has its spin axis oriented along the east–west grid axis and is sensitive to torques about the north–south and vertical axes. Therefore, the two gyros control all three axes.
3. Platform gimbals are the assemblies which actually keep the platform accelerometers stable and enable the airplane to maneuver about the gyro-stabilized Earth-oriented platform. The LN3-2A platform is a four-gimbal system (outer roll, pitch, inner roll and azimuth) allowing the airplane 360 degrees of rotation in all directions. The azimuth, pitch and outer roll gimbals use sliprings and brushes for electrical contacts to allow unlimited freedom. The inner roll gimbal provides a built-in redundancy to prevent a gimbal lock situation when the azimuth and outer roll gimbal axes become aligned at 90 degrees of pitch.

=== Computer ===
The LN3-2A computer controls the platform, computes navigational information and provides special AC and DC voltages required for equipment operation.

The functions of the computer are:

1. to position the azimuth, pitch and roll gimbals of the platform. The basic sequence is that the gyro precession error due to airplane maneuvering is sensed and fed to the platform azimuth synchro resolver. The gyro signals are resolved into pitch and roll error voltages which are amplified in the computer. The computer drives the platform roll and pitch gimbal servo motors. The lower gyro is torqued to precess in azimuth to drive the azimuth gimbal motors. The upper gyro is caged to the lower gyro in azimuth. The gimbal servo motors position the gimbals to compensate for the original deviation.
2. to provide the voltages for the starting and running of the gyro spin motors. During the start of the system the gyros are brought up to spin speed by airplane 115 V AC, 400 Hz power. After the 1 minute coarse align phase the frequency source for the gyros is an electric tuning fork which provides a 3 kHz reference frequency which is divided by 8 to provide an operating frequency of 375 Hz and a running voltage of 90 volts.
3. to control the heating of the component oven, the platform, the gyros and the accelerometers. Some circuits within the computer, like amplifiers, require a very stable amplification factor which can only be maintained if certain components are kept at a precisely held temperature. These components are placed within the Component Oven at 71 °C. Also the gyros and accelerometers are kept at 71 °C ± 1.1 °C. The ambient atmospheric temperature inside the platform is maintained at 51.7 °C by a set of heaters and a circulating fan, and a motor driven cooling air valve controlling the flow of pressurized air through the double walled platform cover.
4. to compute velocity and distance information from acceleration. These navigational computations are performed with carefully designed electronic circuits in harmony with precision electromechanical components. The electronic parts are the Accelerometer Restoring Amplifier which give a voltage that is proportional to the acceleration. Ranging from micro-G's to units of G they span a very impressive dynamic range. Also the Servo Amplifiers, picking off the tiny Gyro signals and amplifying this to control the platform gimbal motors, have tight specifications. The actual integration of the accelerometer signal to a velocity signal is performed by an electronic amplifier which controls a velocity-motor which drives a capacitance tachometer. This cap-tach feedback provides the basic integrator signal since the speed of the cap-tach is proportional to acceleration input. The feedback nulls the acceleration input to stop the motor. The motor positions the velocity shaft to pick off the appropriate potentiometer signal which represents velocity. A dead zone network drives the velocity motor in steps which are smoothed to provide the integrated acceleration (= velocity) signal. The velocity integrators operate in a similar manner to the acceleration integrators, except that the output signal is not smoothed because the so-called M-transmitters are step-function devices. The M-transmitters send the integrated velocity (= distance) signal to the Position and Homing System PHI-4.
5. to sequence and control the coarse- and fine-align phases in conjunction with platform temperature.
6. to sense malfunctions to actuate the go, no-go circuitry of the inertial navigator.
7. Since the LN-3/PHI-4 navigation system is to be used around the globe of the Earth, some systematic corrections for use on this rotating spheroid are implemented in the LN-3: Earth rate, Transport rate, and Coriolis correction. And to suppress inherent errors the system is Schuler tuned.

== Operation of the LN-3 ==
Before starting the Inertial navigator, the pilot has to enter the coordinates of the starting point in the "Align Control" panel in the right-hand console of the F-104G. The first selection in the starting sequence is to rotate the mode selector switch of the "Inertial Navigation Control" Panel from Off to Standby.

In this mode the platform and component oven are brought up to operating temperature; indicated by the "heat" light on the IN Control Panel, which takes several minutes depending on outside and system temperatures.

All at operating temperature the system may be switched to "Align", allowing the machine to commence operation. The computer is powered up and nulls its velocity shafts; the gyros are powered by 115 V and 400 Hz and revving up; the platform is levelled in pitch, inner and outer roll relative to the aircraft using the gimbal synchrotransmitters; and the azimuth axis is driven to the grid north direction using the magnetic heading sensor. This phase of Alignment takes 1 minute and is called coarse align.

After this 1 minute the system switches to the fine align phase, during which the gyro spin motor power is brought down to 95 V and 375 Hz to avoid any magnetic interference with any other aircraft system using 400 Hz. The levelling of the platform is taken over by the X and Y accelerometers sensing even the smallest component of gravity which is an indication of not being precisely level. The levelling of the stable element is achieved by torquing the respective gyro torquers which makes the gimbal motors to follow up and level the stable element. The distance shafts are set to zero; the gyros are at operational speed and the computer is continuously feeding the gyros, and thereby the stable element, with corrections for local Earth rotation. This is called the levelling phase of fine align.

Leveling ends automatically when the computer decides that the platform stable element is exactly locally level, which may take a few minutes. If level, the final phase of alignment is switched on; gyrocompassing. The stable element is exactly level and Schuler-tuned but the gyros are not yet aligned with the Earth rotation axis. Therefore, the stable element tends to turn off-level, which is sensed by the Y accelerometer which signal is fed to the gyro torquer to rotate the azimuth axis of the stable element. This process continues for a few minutes until the correction signal is getting smaller and can be kept almost zero for 50 seconds, which gives confidence that the system is level and aligned. This is visible for the pilot because the green Nav light flashes.

The system is now ready for use and the pilot selects "Nav" on the IN Control Panel, and all circuitry that was involved in the various alignment phases is switched to the navigate mode.

Other possible modes are Compass only which may be selected after a LN3 in-flight failure, and Alert Align to shorten the alignment phase. After the last flight but before shutting down aircraft power the precise heading of the running LN3 is stored and can be used at starting up the next time, if the aircraft is not moved.

=== Performance ===
Specified navigation accuracy for the LN-3 is a 50% circular-error probability (c.e.p.) of two nautical miles after one hour's operation, which is equivalent to a 98% c.e.p. of four nautical miles. Until the −9 version of the LN-3-2A came into service (~1963) results were outside these limits by a fair margin, but since then it has been greatly exceeded in a number of groups of flights.

During manufacturer's development flying at Palmdale, some 1167 flights were made up to October 1961, and the c.e.p. of the LN-3 and PHI-4 combined was a mile or so outside specification. From October 1961 to January 1962 a further 123 flights at Palmdale were assessed, following incorporation of the −9 modifications, and the c.e.p. came almost up to specification.

At Edwards AFB, during Category 2 testing, and at Palmdale during the "avionics marriage" period, mean time between failures of pre-9 systems was considerably below the 200 hr specified, but the target has been exceeded since then.

In November 1965 a LN-3 system was installed in a prepared Flying Tigers Boeing 707 (the Pole Cat) to conduct a pole to pole 51 hours flight, and compare its performance with other means of navigation. The quoted error at the South pole was 2 miles.

== Genealogy ==
Litton Systems Inc., or Litton Industries, the Guidance and Control Systems Division at Beverly Hills CA, were one of the major producers of inertial systems in the US in the 1950s and 1960s, and have made a series of systems for a number of American aircraft.

The Genesis of inertial navigation systems is explained in the following reference.

- The LN-1 was a development attitude reference for the XB-70 Valkyrie.
- The LN-1A was a precision attitude reference for the Grumman E-1A Tracer.
- The LN-2A (military designation AN/ASN-31 or −36) was a Doppler-inertial system for the A-6A Intruder
- The LN-2B was the system for the E-2A Hawkeye,
- and the LN-2C was the system for the P-3A Orion.
- The LN-3-2A (or LN3-2A) was the Inertial Navigation System used in the F-104G Super Starfighter. (development 195?–195?, production 1960-196?) Improved versions of the LN3-2A were −9, −11 and −13.
- The LN-3-2B is the Inertial Navigation System used in the Canadian CF-104.
- The LN-3-13 is fitted to the Italian F-104S/CI and F-104S/CB; enhanced variants of the F-104G from 1969 and onward. In the early 1980s a further upgrade led to the F-104S ASA version which kept the original LN-3; but the ASA-M version of the '90s was equipped with the LN-30A2 inertial navigation system.
- The LN-4 is a miniature inertial system for "a manned orbital vehicle"
- The LN-5 is a (1963)"state of the art experimentation astro-inertial system installed in a Convair 340 R4Y ".
- The LN-7C is the inertial component of the AN/ASN-53 stellar-inertial-Doppler system used on RC-135C aircraft in the late 1960s, early 1970s.
- The LN-12A/B series are an evolution of the LN-3 and are used in F-4C (AN/ASN-48), the F-4D and F-4E (AN/ASN-63), the RF-4C (AN/ASN-56), all with slight differences.

The gimballed platform of the LN3-2A is the Litton P200 platform; the Gyro is the G200 Gyro; and the accelerometer is the A200 accelerometer. (and Litton doc) The G-200 Gyro is commonly used in the LN-2, LN-3 and the LN-12 systems.

=== LN3-2A designation ===
Manufacturers designation of the F-104G system is LN3-2A. Mark the difference in notation LN-3 and LN3-2A with the position of the dividing dash "-" . The designation LN3-2A leaves room for a LN3-1, not known to author. Any additional information about the early Litton's is welcome!

== Other US inertial systems of the early 1960s ==
The Litton LN-3 was one of the first inertial navigators on a production aircraft, but other systems, either inertial navigators or inertial measurement units, of other brands and for various applications with comparable technology existed.

The Autonetics Radar Enhanced Inertial Navigation System (REINS) of the North American A-5 Vigilante was more or less comparable to the LN-3/PHI-4. This system was derived from the XN-6 system developed for the SM-64 Navaho, the N5G system for the AGM-28 Hound Dog and the N2C/N2J/N3A/N3B system for the XB-70, and was related to the N6A-1 navigation system used in the USS Nautilus (SSN-571) and the N10 inertial guidance system for the LGM-30 Minuteman. Note that the Boeing history claims the REINS to be the first inertial navigation in a production airplane.

Nortronics had developed and produced Astro-inertial guidance/navigation systems for the SM-62 Snark. The system developed for the GAM-87 Skybolt was later adapted for use in the Lockheed SR-71 Blackbird and mostly referred to as NAS-14 and/or NAS-21.

The UGM-27 Polaris missile was equipped with a MIT-developed inertial system, which later evolved to the Delco produced IMU of the Apollo PGNCS.

The Saturn V was equipped with a MSFC-developed ST-124-M3 inertial platform which was a further development of the PGM-19 Jupiter's ST-90.

The Convair B-58 Hustler was equipped by AN/ASQ-42 Dopler-inertial system, made by Sperry Corporation.

== LN-3 maintenance and test equipment ==
The LN-3 system was designed to constantly monitor critical parameters, and warn the pilot in case of a malfunction. Depending on the problem the pilot could switch-off the system, or continue in a dead reckoning mode. In case of serious self-diagnosed problems the system would auto shut-down.

=== Flight line maintenance ===
Flight line maintenance of the LN-3, like systemchecks and fault isolation, was performed using specific test equipment :

System Test Console with Adapter and Computer, and Platform on pedestal at Volkel, NL

- MATS (mobile automated test system) (RNlAF operated the MATS not at flightline but shop level.)
- Line test analyzer
- Gyro bias test set

=== Base level maintenance ===
At base (nav)shop level the platform, computer and adapter units were tested and repaired using the following test equipment :

- System test console (STC).
- Bench test console (BTC).

Platform functional test console and platform on pedestal at DELM, Rhenen, NL

=== Depot level maintenance ===
For repairs beyond the capabilities of base level, the RNlAF Electronics Depot (DELM, at Rhenen) was equipped with specific test equipment and tooling to handle the (higher) depot level repairs of the LN-3 system.

The main test stations in use were:

- Platform functional test console (PFTC).
- Module test console.

=== Industry support ===
The repair of the system's sensors, gyros and accelerometers, was performed by Litton. The RNlAF had its sensors repaired by Litton Canada, which also provided all necessary spare parts. Other European users relied on German or Italian subsidiaries/licensees as LITEF at Freiburg and Hamburg.

== LN-3 units on display ==
=== Germany ===
- The Wehr Technische Studiensammlung (WTS) at Koblenz.

Exhibit of the LN3-2A system (without Alert Align Unit) in a vitrine. The platform gimbals can be rotated by the visitor with a remote control box.

=== Netherlands ===
- The HVV (Historische Vliegtuigen Volkel / Historical Fighters Volkel) group at Volkel Air Force Base (NL) has adopted the collection of Navigation Systems of the former DELM / Rhenen museum.

Display of a complete system, running as new. On request explication and demonstration of the system is given.

The LN-3 system was on display at RNlAF Air Force Day's, June 2019 Friday 14 and Saturday 15 at Volkel, Hangar 1.
