= Wah Chang Corporation =

American metals manufacturing company

- Industry: Manufacturing
- Founded: 1916
- Founder: Kuo-Ching Li
- Headquarters: Albany, Linn County, Oregon
- Area served: Worldwide
- Key people: Kuo-Ching Li; Lynn D. Davis
- Revenue: ▲US$$265 million (FY 2005)
- Number of employees: 1,100
- Website: Official Website

Wah Chang Corporation was an American manufacturing company in the metal or alloy industry based in Albany, Oregon in the United States. Since 2014, it has been a business unit of Allegheny Technologies and makes corrosion-resistant metals, such as hafnium, niobium, titanium, vanadium, and zirconium.

== History ==
In 1916 (some sources say 1914), Chinese American mining engineer Kuo-Ching "KC" Li Sr. founded the company in New York state, under the name Wah Chang Trading Corporation. Wah Chang is Cantonese for "fortunate enterprise" or "great development". This expanded as an international tungsten ore and concentrate trading company.

In 1946, the company built a plant in Union City, New Jersey.

In the 1950s, it was also operating tungsten mines in Calento, Nevada, and near Bishop, California.

In 1955, Kuo-Ching Li Sr., Founder of the Wah Chang Trading Corporation, New York, sent his top engineer, Stephen W. H. Yih to the US Bureau of Mines Titanium Development Plant in Boulder City NV to learn how to make the metal. This is where he met Wing Muin Mark, who was directing operations at the Titanium Development Plant. Within one year, Mark and Yih collaborated to produce the highest purity titanium in the world.

In 1956, the Energy Commission (AEC) contracted with Wah Chang to reopen the U.S. Bureau of Mines zirconium plant in Millersburg, near Albany, Oregon, to develop high-purity zirconium for use in the United States Navy's nuclear program. After Wah Chang was granted an additional two-year contract, it decided to build its own zirconium production facility. The facility also produced hafnium metal sponge, and had pilot projects for tantalum and niobium production.

=== Teledyne years (1967–1996) ===
Wah Chang was privately owned by K.C. Li until 1967, when it was acquired by Teledyne, the main Albany plant (located in the then-unincorporated area known as Millersburg) becoming a subsidiary named Teledyne Wah Chang Albany, or TWCA. In 1966, Wah Chang had around 1,200 employees, in plants in Albany, Oregon; Glen Cove, New York; Huntsville, Alabama; and Texas City, Texas, and sales of $40.7 million. The Albany plant was by far the largest, and at the time of its sale to Teledyne, it accounted for around $20 million in annual revenue, with 860 employees at that location. The Alabama factory became a separate subsidiary named Teledyne Wah Chang Huntsville.

In the early 1970s, Wing Mark proposed the idea of making high-purity Hafnium Crystal Bar to Teledyne Wah Chang Albany. He went on to design the production plant, equipment, and process which produced a 99.99999% Hafnium purity, earning him the nickname, “Mr. Hafnium.”

In 1975, TWCA had 1,400 employees, and had $100 million in annual sales.

In 1979, Mark Siddall developed a method for the isotope separation of Zirconium as U.S. patent 4,487,629. After separation the desired isotopes are converted to the metal by the van Arkel-de Boer process.

In 1982, it entered a joint venture with Mitsui and Ishizuka Research to form Zirconium Industry Corp. Zirconium sponge was produced by this venture in Japan to refine the zirconium sand at a new plant from 1983.

Its Glen Cove, New York plant on the North Shore of Long Island became an EPA Superfund site sometime after 1989.

The company began to wind down in the 1990s as the Cold War ended, although it still generated research output like U.S. patent 5,171,549 and U.S. patent 5,581,003.

=== Millersburg Superfund site ===
In 1976, the Oregon State Health Division discovered that the 113,000 cubic yards of industrial sludge at the Millersburg plant contained VOCs, PAHs, PCBs, chromium, thorium, zirconium, radium-226, radium-228, and was radioactive. The groundwater was contaminated with Methyl isobutyl ketone, vinyl chloride, Bis(2-ethylhexyl) phthalate, beryllium, copper, manganese, uranium, PCBs, radium-226, radium-228, ammonium, and fluoride. The sludge ponds were 400 feet from the Willamette River. Wah Chang had also spread 10,000 tons on an agricultural site to determine if that was a valid way to dispose of the material, and that site was radioactive as well. Some of the sludge had also been sent to the Coffin Butte Landfill. The Millersburg plant was listed as a Superfund site in 1983, requiring environmental clean-up, which was carried out over the following several years according to consent decrees in 1997 and 2006. Sludge was excavated, solidified (into cement) and moved to a monocell at the Finley Buttes Landfill near Boardman, Oregon. The site cannot be built on nor can it be used as a drinking water source. Other waste, such as highly acidic (PH 1.0) groundwater contaminated with radium, uranium, and thorium had to be sent to the Low Level Radioactive Disposal Area at Hanford.

The site violated wastewater discharge permits in 1975, 1977, and 1978. It also had water quality permit violations in 1979, 1980, 1989, and was fined for illegal open burning in 1983, and there was a hazardous waste fire in 2018.

=== Allegheny Technologies subsidiary (1996–present) ===
After TWCA merged with Allegheny Ludlum Corporation in 1996, to become Allegheny Technologies Incorporated, the company became ATI Wah Chang.

== Wah Chang people ==
- Kuo-Ching "KC" Li Sr. - Founder, President, and Chairman of Wah Chang Corporation.
- Wing Muin Mark (a.k.a. "Mr. Hafnium") - Chief Engineer/Architect/Operations Manager at Wah Chang Corporation and Teledyne Wah Chang Albany, who developed the processes for producing high-purity Hafnium (99.99999%), Zirconium, and Titanium. Mark received his Bachelor of Science Degree in Chemistry and a Minor in Metallurgy from the University of Illinois at Urbana-Champaign in 1949.
- Stephen W. H. Yih - Engineer and President (after Kuo-Ching Li Sr.) of Teledyne Wah Chang Albany in Albany. Yih served as president for 20 years.
- Edmund F. Baroch - Vice President of Teledyne Wah Chang in Albany, Oregon

== Merger and acquisition ==
- 1916 Kuo-Ching Li founded Wah Chang Trading Corporation in New York state.
- 1967 Acquired by Teledyne and became Teledyne Wah Chang Albany (TWCA) located in Albany, Oregon. It became a subsidiary of Teledyne.
- Wah Chang's Alabama plant became Teledyne Wah Chang Huntsville, a subsidiary of Teledyne.
- 1996 Teledyne acquired by Allegheny Ludlum Corporation, which created parent company named Allegheny Technologies Incorporated (ATI). Teledyne Wah Chang became ATI Wah Chang.
- 2014 ATI Wah Chang renamed ATI Specialty Alloys and Components, a business unit of ATI.

== ATI ==
In March 2014, it was renamed ATI Specialty Alloys and Components.

== See also ==
- Teledyne Technologies
