= George Kozmetsky =

American businessman (1917–2003)

George Kozmetsky (October 5, 1917 – April 30, 2003) was an American technology innovator, businessman, educator, author and philanthropist. He co-founded Teledyne Inc. and was the dean of The University of Texas College of Business Administration (now the McCombs School of Business) for 16 years. In 1977 Kozmetsky founded the IC² Institute, a think tank charged with researching the intersection of business, government and education. In 1993 he received the National Medal of Technology Award from President Bill Clinton.

He received an undergraduate education at the University of Washington where he participated in the Reserve Officers' Training Corps program. After serving in the Army in WWII, he attended Harvard Business School where he earned his MBA and a Doctor of Commercial Science.

He was elected to the 2002 class of Fellows of the Institute for Operations Research and the Management Sciences.

== Awards and honors ==
- 1985 - Golden Plate Award of the American Academy of Achievement
- 1993 - National Medal of Technology and Innovation
