= Allegheny Technologies =

American materials company

ATI Inc.
- Formerly: Allegheny Technologies Incorporated
- Type: Public
- Traded as: NYSE: ATI; S&P 400 component
- Founded: 1996; 30 years ago
- Headquarters: Dallas, Texas, U.S.
- Area served: Worldwide
- Key people: Kimberly A. Fields, (Board Chair), (President & CEO)
- Products: Titanium and titanium alloys, nickel-based alloys and superalloys, stainless and specialty steels, zirconium, hafnium, and niobium, tungsten materials, forgings and castings
- Revenue: ▲US$4.6 billion (2025)
- Operating income: ▲US$641 million (2025)
- Net income: ▲US$404 million (2025)
- Total assets: ▲US$5.1 billion (2025)
- Total equity: ▲US$1.92 billion (2025)
- Number of employees: 7,600 (2026)
- Website: atimaterials.com

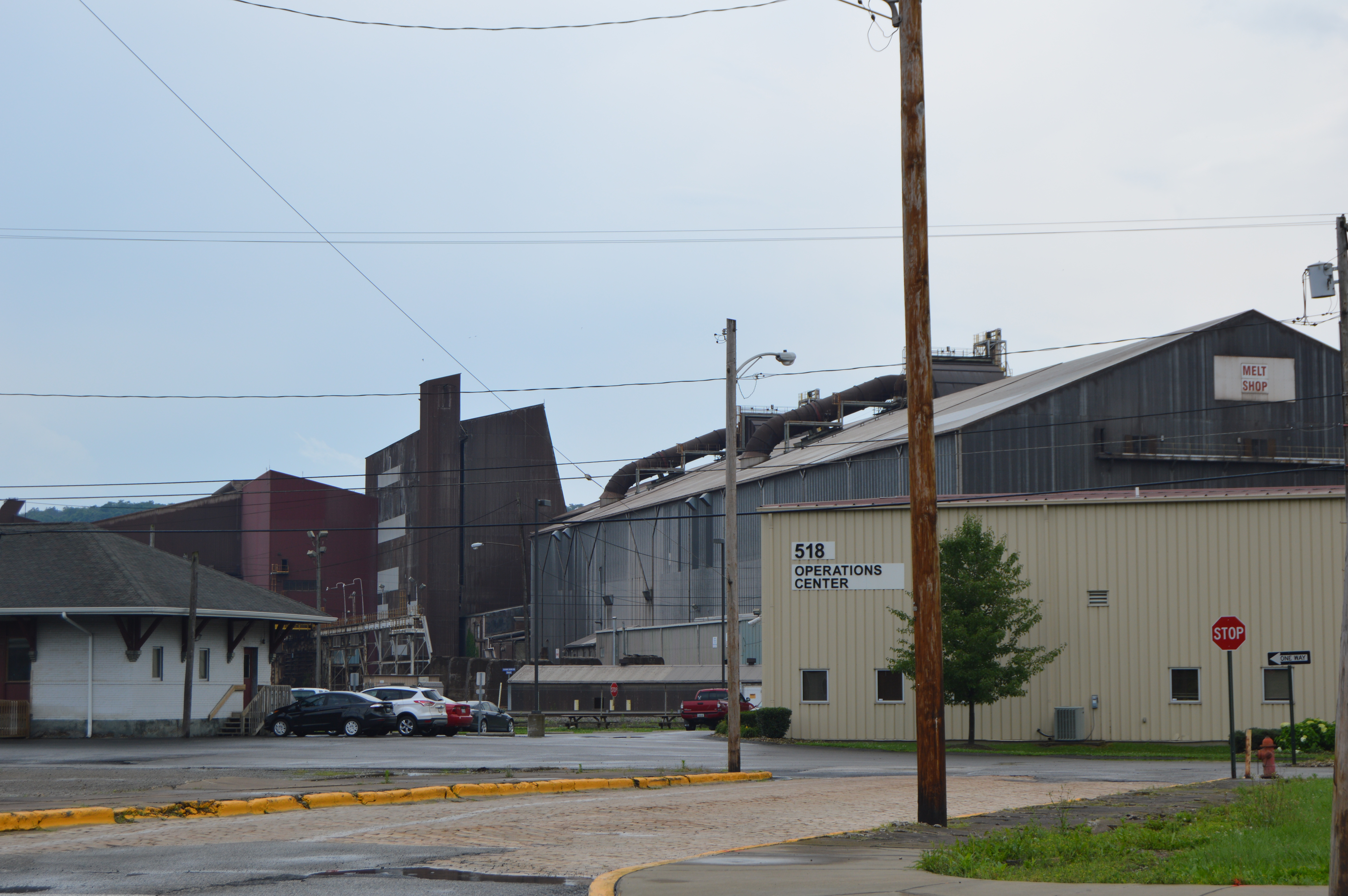
Midland PA Works

ATI Inc. (previously Allegheny Technologies Incorporated) is an American producer of specialty materials headquartered in Dallas, Texas. ATI produces metals including titanium and titanium alloys, nickel-based alloys and superalloys, stainless and specialty steels, zirconium, hafnium, and niobium, tungsten materials, forgings and castings.

ATI's key markets are aerospace and defense, representing 68% of 2025 revenue, particularly commercial jet engines (over 68% of sales), specialty energy, oil & gas, chemical process industry, and medical.

The company operates from four geographic hubs: Specialty Materials in North and South Carolina; Specialty Rolled Products in Pennsylvania; Forged Products in Wisconsin; and Specialty Alloys & Components in Oregon. In addition, it has plants in Alabama, Florida, New York, Washington, Poland and China.

== History ==
=== 20th century mergers and acquisitions ===
In 1939, the merger of Allegheny Steel of Pittsburgh and Ludlum Steel of Watervliet, New York created Allegheny Ludlum Corporation; prior to the merger, the companies had manufactured steel for the Chrysler Building and Empire State Building in New York City. Allegheny Steel had produced stainless steel brightwork for the Model A Ford starting in 1930.

Through the 1970s, Allegheny Ludlum periodically cooperated with Ford to build several one-off promotional cars with stainless steel bodies. Three such cars are on display in the Crawford Auto-Aviation Museum.

In 1978, the company acquired Wilkinson Sword and Scripto. A year later, Allegheny Ludlum acquired Kennedy Company, a maker of magnetic tape products for large computer systems for an undisclosed sum. In 1984, Allegheny Ludlum sold off Scripto to the Tokai Corporation of Japan.

In 1986, the company suffered a $198 million operating loss and chairman Robert Buckley, stepped down amid accusations of mismanagement. In 1987, Wilkinson Sword was sold to Swedish Match for $230 million.

In 1987, Allegheny Ludlum became a public company via an initial public offering under chief executive Dick Simmons

In 1993, the company acquired Jessop Steel.

=== ATI Technologies born 1996 ===
In 1996, it merged with Teledyne to form Allegheny Technologies. The company then spun off several subsidiaries as independent public companies such as Teledyne Technologies and Water Pik Technologies in 1999, to concentrate on its core business of metal and alloy production.

In 1998, the company acquired certain assets of Lukens Washington Steel when it was sold to Bethlehem Steel.

In 1998 ATI bought Teledyne Wah Chang Albany, as well as Oregon Metallurgical Corporation (Oremet). Both companies had plants in the Albany, Oregon area, such as the ATI Specialty Alloys and Components (Wah Chang) zirconium operation in Millersburg, Oregon. The Oremet facility makes high-quality titanium for use in Boeing aircraft.

In 2001 TWCA closed its titanium sponge manufacturing plant in Albany, Oregon; thereafter it would purchase the material on the open market as it continued to produce titanium ingot, slab, and mill products.

In 2004, the company acquired J&L Specialty Steel.

In 2005, the company sold its World Minerals subsidiary to French company Imerys. At the time, it racked up $3.5 billion in sales.

In May 2008 the company invested $260 million in a new plant located in Monroe.

In 2010, the company acquired Ladish for $778 million.

Allegheny Technologies debuted its ATI 425 Titanium Alloy on June 14, 2010, at the land and air-land defense and security exhibition Eurosatory in Paris, France.

In 2012 ATI announced a $325 million investment in a new plant located in Rowley UT. The plant was located adjacent to a US Magnesium plant, for easy interchange of by-products. The Rowley plant uses the Kroll process.

As of August 2016, the firm employed roughly 1,500 people in its Albany region plants.

In August 2016 the firm announced it would idle its plants in Albany and Rowley. The latter plant was idled because other global suppliers, who had entered the market recently, could undercut the Rowley titanium sponge. The Albany plant, which produced mainly for Boeing, was shuttered because of poor demand.

In September 2016 the company said it would shut down its Frackville plant, which produced titanium bar and hair-thin wire in a 55,000-square-foot facility.

In 2019 the firm sold its ATI Cast Products plant in Albany OR to a Cleveland OH company. At the time, the firm employed some 900 people in three plants in the Albany area.

The firm announced in December 2020 the closure of its Albany plant. The plant had been subject to a United Steel Workers certification drive in March 2019.

In March 2021, about 1,300 workers at nine facilities in the northern United States, all member of the United Steelworkers, went on strike over proposed changes to their health care plans. The strike ended in July when the company and USW reached an agreement on a new contract.

In June 2022, the company was officially renamed from Allegheny Technologies Incorporated to ATI. Alongside this, the company's domain was changed from ATImetals.com to ATImaterials.com.

In December 2022 the company closed its Albany plant.

As of September 2023 ATI was "a $3.8 billion company" with more than 6,000 workers in more than 30 locations in the United States and more than a dozen in Europe and Asia.

In June 2023 ATI announced a $28 million expansion of its Richland WA plant, located in the Horn Rapids Industrial Park. At the same time it announced it would re-start its Albany OR operations. The Richland plant has a furnace, which liquefies the metal with electron beams. The liquid metal flows into hearths where defects are removed. The finished products are billets that weigh up to 44,000 pounds. It also has a vacuum arc remelting process. ATI Additive Manufacturing Products was opened in Margate, Florida in 2024.

== Products ==
Titanium and titanium alloys, nickel-based alloys and superalloys, stainless and specialty steels, zirconium, hafnium, and nobium, forgings and castings.

== Environmental record ==
Allegheny Ludlum's Natrona, Pennsylvania and Brackenridge, Pennsylvania plants contributed to the waste at the ALSCO Park Lindane Dump, an EPA Superfund site. These plants also released chromium into the air, which adversely affected air quality at schools in the Highlands School District.

In 2005, Allegheny Ludlum agreed to pay a $2,375,000 penalty to settle a lawsuit brought by the U.S. Department of Justice on behalf of the United States Environmental Protection Agency in 1995, which alleged that the company had unlawfully discharged oil and other pollutants, such as chromium, zinc, copper, and nickel, into the Allegheny River and Kiskiminetas River in the suburbs of Pittsburgh.
