= List of decommissioned ships of the Philippine Navy =

This is a list of retired naval ships operated by the Philippine Navy and its predecessors, the Offshore Patrol and the Philippine Naval Patrol. This list does not include ships transferred to the Philippine Navy for cannibalization of parts.

Philippine navy ships are prefixed BRP (Barko ng Republika ng Pilipinas), formerly RPS (Republic of the Philippines Ship).

== Frigates ==
=== Destroyer escorts ===
Name	Previous names	Pennant	Previous pennant	Commissioned	Decommissioned	Fate	Photo	Notes
Buckley class
RPS Rajah Soliman	USS Bowers (DE-637) / USS Bowers (APD-40)	D-66		Acquired 31 October 1960	December 1964	Acquired through loan on 31 October 1960, sold outright on 21 April 1961. Sunk in a typhoon 29 June 1964, raised and hulk sold as scrap 31 January 1966.		
Edsall class
BRP Rajah Lakandula	USS Camp (DE-251), RVNS Tran Hung Dao (HQ-1)	PF-4	PS-4	Acquired 27 July 1976	12 September 1988	Arrived in Philippines from South Vietnam in 1975, formally acquired 5 April 1976. Listed as stationary dockside barracks until 1999. Probably scrapped.		
Cannon class / Datu Kalantiaw class
BRP Datu Kalantiaw	USS Booth (DE-170)	PS-76		15 December 1967	1981	Ran aground in a typhoon on 21 September 1981.		
BRP Datu Sikatuna	USS Amick (DE-168), JDS Asahi (DE-262), RPS Datu Sikatuna (PS-77)	PF-5	PS-77	27 February 1980	1989	Scrapped in 1989.		
BRP Rajah Humabon	USS Atherton (DE-169), JDS Hatsuhi (DE-263), RPS Rajah Humabon (PS-78)	PS-11	PF-11 / PF-6 / PS-78	27 February 1980	15 March 2018	Capsized in 2022		
Note: 2 more Cannon-class destroyer escorts, the former USS Muir (DE-770) and USS Sutton (DE-771), were transferred to the Philippine Navy in 1977 but were cannibalized for parts.

=== High Endurance Cutters ===
Name	Previous names	Pennant	Previous pennant	Commissioned	Decommissioned	Fate	Photo	Notes
Barnegat class / Casco class / Andrés Bonifacio class
BRP Andrés Bonifacio	USS Chincoteague (AVP-24) / USCGC Chincoteague (WAVP-375/WHEC-375), RVNS Lý Thường Kiệt (HQ-16), RPS Andres Bonifacio (PF-7)	PF-7		27 July 1976	1993	Acquired 5 April 1976. Reportedly decommissioned in June 1985, but she was still listed as active as of June 1993. Sold for scrap in 2003.		
BRP Gregorio del Pilar	USS Wachapreague (AGP-8) / USCGC McCulloch (WAVP-386/WHEC-386), RVNS Ngô Quyền (HQ-17), RPS Gregorio del Pilar (PF-8)	PF-12	PF-8	7 February 1977	April 1990	Acquired 5 April 1976. Was decommissioned in June 1985, but was recommissioned again in 1987. Discarded July 1990, probably sold for scrap .		
BRP Diego Silang	USS Bering Strait (AVP-34) / USCGC Bering Strait (WAVP-382/WHEC-382), RVNS Trần Quang Khải (HQ-02), RPS Diego Silang (PF-9)	PF-14	PF-9	5 April 1976?	April 1990	Acquired 5 April 1976. Was decommissioned in June 1985, but was recommissioned again in 1987. Discarded July 1990, probably sold for scrap.		
BRP Francisco Dagohoy	USS Castle Rock (AVP-35) / USCGC Castle Rock (WAVP-383/WHEC-383), RVNS Trần Bình Trọng (HQ-05), RPS Francisco Dagohoy (PF-10)	PF-10		23 June 1979	June 1985	Acquired 5 April 1976. Discarded March 1993, probably sold for scrap.		
Note: 2 more ships of the class, the former USCGC Cook Inlet (WAVP-384) and USCGC Yakutat (WAVP-380), were transferred to the Philippine Navy on 5 April 1976 and were cannibalized for spare parts.

== Corvettes ==
=== Patrol craft escort ===
Name	Previous names	Pennant	Previous pennant	Commissioned	Decommissioned	Fate	Photo	Notes
PCE-842-class / Miguel Malvar-class
BRP Cebu	USS PCE-881, RPS Cebu (E-28), RPS Cebu (PS-28)	PS-28	E-28	2 July 1948	1 October 2019	Decommissioned from active service on 1 October 2019. Its retirement is in line with the PN's "Phase-In/Phase-Out" Program which is implemented to welcome new and more modern naval assets.		
BRP Negros Occidental	USS PCE-884, RPS Negros Occidental (E-29), RPS Negros Occidental (PS-29)	PS-29	E-29	2 July 1948	9 December 2010	Acquired 2 July 1948. No detail yet, still in Naval Base Cavite		
RPS Leyte	USS PCE-885, RPS Leyte (E-30)	PS-30	E-30	2 July 1948	1979	Acquired and commissioned on 2 July 1948. Ran aground by typhoon near Poro Point, La Union in 1979, damaged beyond repair and stricken from service. Probably scrapped.		
BRP Pangasinan	USS PCE-891, RPS Pangasinan (E-31), RPS Pangasinan (PS-31)	PS-31	E-31	2 July 1948	1 March 2021	Decommissioned from active service on 1 March 2021. Its retirement is in line with the PN's "Phase-In/Phase-Out" Program which is implemented to welcome new and more modern naval assets. Sunk as a naval target for a sinking exercise (SINKEX) in "Balikatan" 2023		
BRP Iloilo	USS PCE-897, RPS Iloilo (E-32), RPS Iloilo (PS-32)	PS-32	E-32	2 July 1948	September 2016	Awaiting disposal as of February 2017.		
BRP Miguel Malvar	USS Brattleboro (PCE(R)-852), RPS Miguel Malvar (PS-19)	PS-19		7 February 1977	10 December 2021	Decommissioned from active service on 10 December 2021. Its retirement is in line with the PN's "Phase-In/Phase-Out" Program which is implemented to welcome new and more modern naval assets.		
BRP Sultan Kudarat	USS PCE-895, RVNS Đống Đa II, RPS Sultan Kudarat (PS-22)	PS-22		27 July 1976	5 July 2019	Decommissioned from active service on July 6, 2019. Its retirement is in line with the PN's "Phase-In/Phase-Out" Program which is implemented to welcome new and more modern naval assets.		
BRP Datu Marikudo	USS Amherst (PCE(R)-853), RVNS Van Kiep II (HQ-14), RPS Datu Marikudo (PS-23)	PS-23		5 April 1976	9 December 2010	Acquired 5 April 1976. Hulk still in Naval Base Cavite		

=== Fleet Minesweepers ===
Name	Previous names	Pennant	Previous pennant	Commissioned	Decommissioned	Fate	Photo	Notes
Auk class / Rizal class
BRP Rizal	USS Murrelet (AM-372)/(MSF-372), RPS Rizal (PS-69)	PS-74	PS-69	18 June 1965	29 January 2020	Awaiting final disposition.		
BRP Quezon	USS Vigilance (AM-324), RPS Quezon (PS-70)	PS-70		1 August 1967	1 March 2021	Awaiting final disposition.		
Admirable class / Miguel Malvar class
RPS Samar	USS Project (AM-278)	PS-33	M-33	24 May 1948	1960	Decommissioned from PN in 1960, she was transferred to the Bureau Coast & Geodetic Survey and converted to survey ship, renamed RPS Research Decommissioned in 1975, and probably scrapped.		
RPS Datu Tupas	USS Shelter (AM-301), RVNS Chi Linh (HQ-11)	PS-18		5 April 1976	1977	No information on her fate. Believed to be in service only for a year before used as a parts hulk.		
BRP Magat Salamat	USS Gayety (AM-239), RVNS Chi Lăng II (HQ-08), RPS Magat Salamat (PS-20)	PS-20		7 February 1977	10 December 2021	unknown		

== Patrol vessels ==
=== Submarine Chasers 173' ===
Name	Previous names	Pennant	Previous pennant	Commissioned	Decommissioned	Fate	Photo	Notes
PC-461 class / Camarines Sur class
RPS Camarines Sur	USS PC-1121	C-21		2 July 1948	1953	Stricken in 1953, believed to be rebuilt to PGM-33-class and delivered back to Philippine Navy in 1954 as RPS Camarines Sur (PG-48).		
RPS Bohol	USS PC-1131	PS-22	C-22	2 July 1948	1969	Scrapped in 1969		
RPS Zamboanga del Sur	USS PC-1133	PS-23	C-23	2 July 1948	16 November 1956	Stricken from Philippine Navy list on 16 November 1956. Probably scrapped		
RPS Batangas	USS PC-1134	PS-24	C-24	21 July 1948	1979	Decommissioned in 1979. Fate unknown.		
RPS Nueva Ecija	USS PC-1241	PS-25	C-25	2 July 1948	1977	Sold to Philippines in October 1958, decommissioned in 1977.		
RPS Negros Oriental	USS PC-1563	PS-26	C-26	2 July 1948	26 June 1963	Sunk during typhoon at Guam in November 1962. Raised, decommissioned and sold as scrap 26 June 1963.		
RPS Capiz	USS PC-1564	PS-27	C-27	2 July 1948	1979	Decommissioned in 1979. Fate unknown.		
BRP Nueva Vizcaya	USS PC-568 / USS Altus (PC-568), RPS Nueva Vizcaya (PS-80)	PS-80		2 March 1968	23 June 1990	Sunk during a typhoon in Cebu on 10 March 1993, sold as scrap to Calixto Enterprises		
BRP Negros Oriental	USS PC-1171, RFS L'Inconstant (P 636), E-312, RPS Negros Oriental (PS-26)	PS-26		April 1976	29 March 1990	Served with French Navy from 1951 to 1956, to Khmer Republic from 1956 to 1975, bought in 1976. Sold for scrap to Trans Manila Company		

=== Patrol Craft Sweepers 136' ===
Name	Previous names	Pennant	Previous pennant	Commissioned	Decommissioned	Fate	Photo	Notes
PCS-1376 class / Tarlac class
RPS Tarlac	USS YMS-450 / USS PCS-1399 / USS PC-1399	PG-11	P-11	22 January 1948	1969	Transferred 22 January 1948. Stricken in 1969. Scrapped.		
RPS Laguna	USS PCSC-1403 / USS PCS-1403 / USS PC-1403	PG-12	P-12	22 January 1948	1969	Transferred 22 January 1948. Stricken in 1969. Scrapped.		

=== Submarine Chasers 110' ===
Name	Previous names	Pennant	Previous pennant	Commissioned	Decommissioned	Fate	Photo	Notes
SC-497 class / Cagayan class
RPS Cagayan	USS SC-731	P-14	-	2 July 1948	1956	Stricken in 1956, scrapped.		
RPS Mountain Province	USS SC-736	P-15	-	2 July 1948	?	Scrapped.		
RPS Ilocos Sur	USS SC-739	P-16	-	2 July 1948	1956	Decommissioned and turned over to Bureau of Customs on 8 or 9 August 1956. Fate unknown.		
RPS Alert	USS SC-1267	PY-54	-	2 July 1948	1956	Sank in 1956.		
RPS Surigao	USS SC-747	P-17	-	2 July 1948	?	Scrapped		
RPS Isabella	USS SC-750	P-18	-	2 July 1948	1956	Stricken in 1956. Scrapped.		
RPS Cavite	USS SC-982	P-19	-	2 July 1948	?	Scrapped		
RPS Malampay Sound	USS SC-1274, RPS Ilocos Norte (P-20)	AF-20	P-20	2 July 1948	?	Scrapped		
?	USS SC-732	?		2 July 1948	?			
?	USS SC-699	?		2 July 1948	?	Scrapped		
?	USS SC-742	?		2 July 1948	?			
?	USS SC-743	?		2 July 1948	?	Scrapped		
?	USS SC-769	?		2 July 1948	?	Scrapped		
?	USS SC-1278 / USS SCC-1278	?		2 July 1948	?	Scrapped		

=== Large Patrol Crafts ===
Name	Previous names	Pennant	Previous pennant	Commissioned	Decommissioned	Fate	Photo	Notes
Gen. Emilio Aguinaldo class
BRP Gen. Emilio Aguinaldo	-	PG-140	-	21 November 1990	2016	Awaiting disposal as of June 2017		
BRP Gen. Antonio Luna	-	PG-141	-	1999	8 April 2016			
Kagitingan class
BRP Kagitingan	BRP Katapangan (P-101)	PG-101	P-101	9 February 1979	2004	Scrapped and cannibalized as spares for sisterships		
BRP Bagong Lakas	-	PB-102	PG-102 / P-102	9 February 1979	?	Decommissioned probably between 2020 and 2023.		
BRP Katatagan	-	PG-103	P-103	22 April 1981	1989	Built by Bataan Shipyard & Engineering Corp (BASECO), and blessed on 25 January 1980. Decommissioned in 1989 and cannibalized for spares for sisterships.		

=== Motor Gunboats ===
Name	Previous names	Pennant	Previous pennant	Commissioned	Decommissioned	Fate	Photo	Notes
PGM-9 class
?	USS PGM-10 / USS PC-805	?		1948	?	Details unknown		
PGM-33 class
RPS Camarines Sur	USS PGM-33	PG-48	G-48	15 September 1954	1974	Struck 1974		
RPS Sulu	USS PGM-34	PG-49	G-49	22 November 1954	1974	Struck 1974		
RPS La Union	USS PGM-35	PG-50	G-50	3 January 1955	1974	Struck 1974		
RPS Antique	USS PGM-36	PG-51	G-51	18 May 1955	1974	Struck 1974		
RPS Masbate	USS PGM-37	PG-52	G-52	2 March 1956	1965	Sunk and decommissioned in 1965.		
RPS Misamis Occidental	USS PGM-38	PG-53	G-53	3 May 1956	1974	Struck 1974		
PGM-39 class
BRP Agusan	USS PGM-39, RPS Agusan (G-61)	PG-61	G-61	March 1960	1992	Built 29 November 1959, and transferred to Philippine Navy in 1960 as part of US Military Assistance Program. Transferred to Philippine Coast Guard as BRP Agusan (PG-61) in 1992. Sold as scrap November 2007.		
BRP Catanduanes	USS PGM-40, RPS Catanduanes (G-62)	PG-62	G-62	March 1960	1992	Built 9 January 1960, and transferred to Philippine Navy in 1960 as part of US Military Assistance Program. Transferred to Philippine Coast Guard as BRP Catanduanes (PG-21) in 1992. Sold as scrap June 2006.		
BRP Romblon	USS PGM-41, RPS Romblon (G-63)	PG-63	G-63	June 1960	1992	Built 9 February 1960, and transferred to Philippine Navy in 1960 as part of US Military Assistance Program. Transferred to Philippine Coast Guard as BRP Romblon (PG-63) in 1992. Sold as scrap 7 November 2007.		
BRP Palawan	USS PGM-42, RPS Palawan (G-64)	PG-64	G-64	June 1960	1992	Built 9 March 1960, and transferred to Philippine Navy in 1960 as part of US Military Assistance Program. Transferred to Philippine Coast Guard as BRP Palawan (PG-64) in 1992 and decommissioned in June 2018.		
BRP Yachi	USS PGM-55, KRI Bentang Silungkang (P 572), RPS Yachi (G-57)	PG-57	G-57	1965	1982	Built 10 November 1961. Initially bound for Indonesia, but instead was transferred to Philippine Navy 1965. Struck in 1982.		
RPS Yanga / BRP Yanga	USS PGM-56, KRI Bentang Waitatiri (P 571), RPS Yanga (G-59)	PG-59	G-59	1965	1982	Built 10 November 1961. Initially bound for Indonesia, but instead was transferred to Philippine Navy in 1965. Struck in 1982.		
BRP Yundi	USS PGM-57, KRI Bentang Kalukuang (P 570), RPS Yundi (G-60)	PG-60	G-60	1965	1982	Built 10 November 1961. Initially bound for Indonesia, but instead was transferred to Philippine Navy in 1965. Struck in 1982.		
BRP Basilan	USS PGM-83, Hon Troc (HQ 618), RPS Basilan (PG-60)	PG-60		December 1975	1989	Built 8 December 1966 and transferred to South Vietnamese Navy in April 1967. Was part of ships escaping South Vietnam and handed-over to the US in 1975. Transferred to Philippine Navy in December 1975. Decommissioning and struck in 1989.		

=== Patrol Killers ===
Name	Previous names	Pennant	Previous pennant	Commissioned	Decommissioned	Fate	Photo	Notes
Haksaeng (Seahawk/Schoolboy) class / Conrado Yap class
BRP Conrado Yap	ROKS PK-1??	PG-840	-	19 June 1993	7 June 2001			
BRP Teodorico Dominado Jr	ROKS PK-???	PG-842	-	19 June 1993	7 June 2001			
BRP Cosme Acosta	ROKS PK-1??	PG-843	-	19 June 1993	7 June 2001			
BRP Jose Artiaga	ROKS PK-???	PG-844	-	19 June 1993	10 December 2010			
BRP ???	ROKS PK-1??	PG-845	-	19 June 1993	7 June 2001	Believed to be commissioned only for a very short time until it became a spare parts hulk for its sisterships.		
BRP Nicanor Jimenez	ROKS PK-1??	PG-846	-	19 June 1993	7 June 2001			
BRP Leopoldo Regis	ROKS PK-???	PG-847	-	19 June 1993	2018?			
BRP Leon Tadina	ROKS PK-1??	PG-848		19 June 1993	7 June 2001			
BRP Loreto Danipog	ROKS PK-???	PG-849		19 June 1993	8 January 2003			
BRP Apollo Tiano	ROKS PK-???	PG-851	-	19 June 1993	8 April 2016			
BRP ???	ROKS PK-1??	PG-852	-	19 June 1993	?	Believed to be commissioned only for a very short time until it became a spare parts hulk for its sisterships.		
BRP Sulpicio Fernandez	ROKS PK-???	PG-853		19 June 199	2015	Hulk being tendered for disposal as of November 2015.		
Chamsuri/Wildcat (PKM-200 series) class / Tomas Batilo class
BRP Tomas Batilo	PKM 225	PG-110		22 May 1996	8 January 2003	Acquired in August 1995 and commissioned on 22 May 1996. Sunk by typhoon in 2003, raised in 2009, sold for scrap.		
BRP Bonny Serrano	PKM-226	PC-111	PG-111	22 May 1996	17 December 2020	Sunk as target on 2022		
BRP Bienvenido Salting	PKM 229	PC-112	PG-112	22 May 1996	31 October 2018	Acquired on 15 June 1995 and commissioned on 22 May 1996. Retired in October 2018, to be used as parts hulk for other remaining ships of the class		
BRP Salvador Abcede	PKM-231	PC-114	PG-114	22 May 1996	1 March 2021	Awaiting disposal as of March 2021		
BRP Ramon Aguirre	PKM-???	PG-115	-	?	?	Details unknown.		
BRP Nicolas Mahusay	PKM ???	PC-116	PG-116 / PC-119	2 July 1998	29 January 2020			
BRP Dionisio Ojeda	PKM 232	PC-117	PG-117	2007	June 2016	Sunk as target for the Spike-ER missiles fired from MPAC Mk.3 in 2018		
BRP Emilio Liwanag	PKM-223	PC-118	PG-118	15 April 2011	1 March 2021	Awaiting disposal as of March 2021		

=== Coastal Patrol Crafts ===
Name	Previous names	Pennant	Previous pennant	Commissioned	Decommissioned	Fate	Photo	Notes
HDML class / Yanga class
RPS Yindi	HMAS HDML 1329 / HMAS SDML 1329 / HMAS SDB 1329 / HMS ML 1329	P-57	-	21 October 1958	1964	Previously assigned on loan with Royal Hong Kong Defence Force. Donated to Philippines as part of economic assistance of Australia to SEATO defense. Delivered to Manila from Hong Kong by USS Oak Hill on 15 August 1958.		
RPS Yarraman	HMAS HDML 1328 / HMAS SDML 1328 / HMAS SDB 1328 / HMS ML 1328	P-58	-	21 October 1958	1964	Previously assigned on loan with Royal Hong Kong Defence Force. Donated to Philippines as part of economic assistance of Australia to SEATO defense. Delivered to Manila from Hong Kong by USS Oak Hill on 15 August 1958.		
RPS Yanga	HMAS HDML 1326 / HMAS SDML 1326 / HMAS SDB 1326 / HMS ML 1326	P-59	-	21 October 1958	1964	Previously assigned on loan with Royal Hong Kong Defence Force. Donated to Philippines as part of economic assistance of Australia to SEATO defense. Delivered to Manila from Hong Kong by USS Oak Hill on 15 August 1958.		
RPS Yacki	HMAS HDML 1323 / HMAS SDML 1323 / HMAS SDB 1323 / HMS ML 1323	P-60	-	21 October 1958	1964	Previously assigned on loan with Royal Hong Kong Defence Force. Donated to Philippines as part of economic assistance of Australia to SEATO defense. Delivered to Manila from Hong Kong by USS Oak Hill on 15 August 1958.		
Swift Mk. I class
-	-	DF-300	USN PCF-6633, PCF-300	March 1966	15 April 1998	Under Philippine Coast Guard control from 9 October 1980. Transferred to civilianized Philippine Coast Guard on 15 April 1998. Active as of 2020.		
-	-	DF-301	USN PCF-6634, PCF-301	March 1966	15 April 1998	Under Philippine Coast Guard control from 9 October 1980. Transferred to civilianized Philippine Coast Guard on 15 April 1998. Active as of 2018.		
-	-	DF-302	USN PCF-35, PCF-302	August 1966	15 April 1998	Under Philippine Coast Guard control from 9 October 1980. Transferred to civilianized Philippine Coast Guard on 15 April 1998.		
-	-	DF-303	USN PCF-36, PCF-303	August 1966	15 April 1998	Under Philippine Coast Guard control from 9 October 1980. Transferred to civilianized Philippine Coast Guard on 15 April 1998.		
Swift Mk. II class
-	-	DF-304	USN PCF-37, PCF-304	August 1966	??	Under Philippine Coast Guard control from 9 October 1980. Fate unknown.		
-	-	DF-305	USN PCF-38, PCF-305	August 1966	15 April 1998	Under Philippine Coast Guard control from 9 October 1980. Transferred to civilianized Philippine Coast Guard on 15 April 1998.		
-	-	DF-306	USN PCF-681, PCF-306	February 1968	?	Under Philippine Coast Guard control from 9 October 1980. Fate unknown.		
-	-	DF-307	USN PCF-682, PCF-307	February 1968	15 April 1998	Under Philippine Coast Guard control from 9 October 1980. Transferred to civilianized Philippine Coast Guard on 15 April 1998.		
-	-	DF-308	USN PCF-683, PCF-308	February 1968	15 April 1998	Under Philippine Coast Guard control from 9 October 1980. Transferred to civilianized Philippine Coast Guard on 15 April 1998.		
-	-	DF-309	USN PCF-684, PCF-309	February 1968	15 April 1998	Under Philippine Coast Guard control from 9 October 1980. Transferred to civilianized Philippine Coast Guard on 15 April 1998.		
-	-	DF-310	USN PCF-685, PCF-310	February 1968	15 April 1998	Under Philippine Coast Guard control from 9 October 1980. Transferred to civilianized Philippine Coast Guard on 15 April 1998.		
-	-	DF-311	USN PCF-686, PCF-311	February 1968	15 April 1998	Under Philippine Coast Guard control from 9 October 1980. Transferred to civilianized Philippine Coast Guard on 15 April 1998.		
-	-	DF-312	USN PCF-687, PCF-312	February 1968	15 April 1998	Under Philippine Coast Guard control from 9 October 1980. Transferred to civilianized Philippine Coast Guard on 15 April 1998. Active as of 2015.		
-	-	DF-313	USN PCF-688, PCF-313	February 1968	15 April 1998	Under Philippine Coast Guard control from 9 October 1980. Transferred to civilianized Philippine Coast Guard on 15 April 1998. Active as of 2018.		
-	-	DF-314	USN PCF-6911, PCF-314	July 1970	?	Under Philippine Coast Guard control from 9 October 1980. Fate unknown		
-	-	DF-315	USN PCF-6912, PCF-315	July 1970	?	Under Philippine Coast Guard control from 9 October 1980. Fate unknown		
-	-	DF-316	USN PCF-6913, PCF-316	July 1970	?	Under Philippine Coast Guard control from 9 October 1980. Fate unknown		
Abra class
BRP Abra	RPS Abra	FB-83	-	February 1970	1990s	Built in Singapore by Vosper for Philippine Coast Guard, and was declared flagship. Deleted as of 1990s.		
BRP Bukidnon	RPS Bukidnon	FB-84	-	1971	1990s	Built in Cavite Naval Yard for Philippine Coast Guard. Deleted as of 1990s.		
BRP Tablas	RPS Tablas	FB-85	-	1975	1990s	Built in Cavite Naval Yard for Philippine Coast Guard. Deleted as of 1990s.		
De Havilland 9209 class
-	-	PB-317	PCF-317 / DF-317	1974–1975	17 December 2020	Awaiting disposal as of December 2020		
-	-	DF-318	PCF-318	1974–1975	15 April 1998	Under Philippine Coast Guard control from 9 October 1980. Transferred to civilianized Philippine Coast Guard on 15 April 1998. Decommissioning date around late 2000s, fate unknown.		
-	-	DF-319	PCF-319	1974–1975	15 April 1998	Under Philippine Coast Guard control from 9 October 1980. Transferred to civilianized Philippine Coast Guard on 15 April 1998. Decommissioning date around early 2000s, fate unknown.		
-	-	PB-320	PCF-320 / DF-320	1974–1975	17 December 2020	Awaiting disposal as of December 2020		
-		PB-321	PCF-321 / DF-321	1974–1975	17 December 2020	Awaiting disposal as of December 2020		
-	-	PB-322	PCF-322 / DF-322	1974–1975	17 December 2020	Awaiting disposal as of December 2020		
-	-	PB-323	PCF-323 / DF-323	1974–1975	17 December 2020	Awaiting disposal as of December 2020		
Swift Mk. III class
-	-	DF-325	PCF-325	1972	15 April 1998	Under Philippine Coast Guard control from 9 October 1980. Transferred to civilianized Philippine Coast Guard on 15 April 1998. Decommissioned 2017 or 2018.		
-	-	DF-326	PCF-326	1972	15 April 1998	Under Philippine Coast Guard control from 9 October 1980. Transferred to civilianized Philippine Coast Guard on 15 April 1998. Decommissioned 2017 or 2018.		
-	-	DF-327	PCF-327	1972	15 April 1998	Under Philippine Coast Guard control from 9 October 1980. Transferred to civilianized Philippine Coast Guard on 15 April 1998. Decommissioned 2017 or 2018.		
-	-	DF-328	PCF-328	1972	15 April 1998	Under Philippine Coast Guard control from 9 October 1980. Transferred to civilianized Philippine Coast Guard on 15 April 1998. Decommissioned 2017 or 2018.		
-	-	DF-329	PCF-329	1972	15 April 1998	Under Philippine Coast Guard control from 9 October 1980. Transferred to civilianized Philippine Coast Guard on 15 April 1998. Decommissioned 2017 or 2018.		
-	-	DF-330	PCF-330	1972	15 April 1998	Under Philippine Coast Guard control from 9 October 1980. Transferred to civilianized Philippine Coast Guard on 15 April 1998. Decommissioned 2017 or 2018.		
-	-	DF-331	PCF-331	1975?	15 April 1998	Under Philippine Coast Guard control from 9 October 1980. Transferred to civilianized Philippine Coast Guard on 15 April 1998. Decommissioned 2017 or 2018.		
-	-	DF-332	PCF-332	1975?	15 April 1998	Under Philippine Coast Guard control from 9 October 1980. Transferred to civilianized Philippine Coast Guard on 15 April 1998. Decommissioned 2017 or 2018.		
-	-	PB-333	DF-333, PCF-333	April 1975	17 December 2020	Awaiting disposal as of December 2020		
-	-	DF-334	PCF-334	April 1975	15 April 1998	Under Philippine Coast Guard control from 9 October 1980. Transferred to civilianized Philippine Coast Guard on 15 April 1998. Active as of 2016.		
-	-	PB-336	DF-336, PCF-336	November 1975	17 December 2020	Awaiting disposal as of December 2020		
-	-	PB-340	DF-340, PCF-340	December 1976	17 December 2020	Awaiting disposal as of December 2020		
-	-	DF-341	PB-341	1981?	17 December 2020	Part of second batch ordered in 1980. Awaiting disposal as of December 2020		
-	-	PB-343	DF-343, PCF-343	1981?	17 December 2020	Part of second batch ordered in 1980. Awaiting disposal as of December 2020		
-	-	DF-347	PCF-347	1982?	15 April 1998	Under Philippine Coast Guard control from 9 October 1980. Transferred to civilianized Philippine Coast Guard on 15 April 1998. Fate unknown		
-	-	DF-348	PB-348	1982?	17 December 2020	Part of second batch ordered in 1980. Awaiting disposal as of December 2020		
-	-	PB-349	DF-349, PCF-349	1982	17 December 2020	Part of second batch ordered in 1980. Awaiting disposal as of December 2020		
-	-	PB-350	DF-350, PCF-350	1982-1983?	17 December 2020	Part of second batch ordered in 1980. Awaiting disposal as of December 2020		
-	-	PB-351	DF-351, PCF-351	1983?	17 December 2020	Part of second batch ordered in 1980. Awaiting disposal as of December 2020		
-	-	PB-352	DF-352, PCF-352	1983?	17 December 2020	Part of second batch ordered in 1980. Awaiting disposal as of December 2020		
-	-	DF-353	PCF-353	1983?	2020?	Restored and made as an on-land display piece at Philippine Navy Museum		
-	-	PB-354	DF-354, PCF-354	1983?	17 December 2020	Part of second batch ordered in 1980. Awaiting disposal as of December 2020		

=== Hydrofoil Patrol Crafts ===
Name	Previous names	Pennant	Previous pennant	Commissioned	Decommissioned	Fate	Photo	Notes
Camiguin class
RPS Camiguin	-	HB-72	H-72	April 1965	1979	Built in Italy, laid down on 26 May 1964. Decommissioning in 1979, fate unknown.		
RPS Siquijor	-	HB-72	H-72	April 1965	1979	Built in Italy, laid down on 28 October 1964. Decommissioning in 1979, fate unknown.		
Bontoc class
RPS Bontoc	-	HB-74	H-74	December 1966	1979	Built in Japan, and commissioned in December 1966. Decommissioning in 1979, fate unknown.		
RPS Baler	-	HB-75	H-75	December 1966	1979	Built in Japan, and commissioned in December 1966. Decommissioning in 1979, fate unknown.		

== Mine warfare vessels ==
=== Coastal minesweepers ===
Name	Previous names	Pennant	Previous pennant	Commissioned	Decommissioned	Fate	Photo	Notes
Adjutant class / Zambales class
RPS Zambales	USS AMS-218 / USS MSC-218	PM-55	M-55	7 March 1956	1979	Fate unknown		
RPS Zamboanga del Norte	USS AMS-219 / USS MSC-219	PM-56	M-56	23 April 1956	1979	Fate unknown		

=== Minesweepers ===
Name	Previous names	Pennant	Previous pennant	Commissioned	Decommissioned	Fate	Photo	Notes
Aggressive class / Davao del Norte class
RPS Davao del Norte	USS Energy (AM-436) / USS MSO-436	PM-91	-	5 July 1972	1 July 1977	Loaned to the Philippine Navy in 1972 and returned in 1977. Sold for scrapping 8 July 1977		
RPS Davao del Sur	USS Firm (AM-444) / USS MSO-444	PM-92	-	5 July 1972	1 July 1977	Loaned to the Philippine Navy in 1972 and returned in 1977. Sold for scrapping 8 July 1977		

== Amphibious warfare vessels ==
=== Landing Ship Tank ===
Class	Name	Previous names	Pennant	Commissioned	Decommissioned	Fate	Photo	Notes
LST-1 class	RPS Cotabato	USS LST-75	LT-36 / T-36	2 July 1948	1964	Transferred 30 December 1947, commissioned on 2 July 1948. Scrapped in 1964.		
LST-542 class	RPS Pampanga	USS LST-842	LT-37 / T-37	2 July 1948	unknown	Transferred 22 January 1948, commissioned on 2 July 1948. Reported as scrapped.		
LST-542 class	RPS Bulacan	USS LST-843	LT-38 / T-38	2 July 1948	between 1974 and 1979	Transferred 22 January 1948, commissioned on 2 July 1948. Probably decommissioned between 1974 and 1979. Fate unknown.		
LST-542 class	RPS Albay	USS LST-865	LT-39 / T-39	2 July 1948	between 1974 and 1979	Transferred 30 December 1947, commissioned on 2 July 1948. Probably decommissioned between 1974 and 1979. Fate unknown.		
LST-542 class	RPS Misamis Oriental	USS LST-875	LT-40 / T-40	2 July 1948	between 1974 and 1979	Commissioned on 2 July 1948. Probably decommissioned between 1974 and 1979. Fate unknown.		
LST-491 class	RPS Bataan	USS LST-515 / USS Caddo Parish (LST-515)	LT-96 / LT-85	26 November 1969	between 1974 and 1979	Transferred on lease 26 November 1969. Probably decommissioned between 1974 and 1979 and returned to the United States. Fate unknown.		
LST-542 class	BRP Cagayan / RPS Cagayan	USS LST-825 / USS Hickman County (LST-825)	LT-97 / LT-86	26 November 1969	1988	Transferred as grant on 26 November 1969. Fate unknown, probably sold for scrap		
LST-542 class	BRP Ilocos Norte / RPS Ilocos Norte	USS LST-905 / USS Madera County (LST-905)	LT-98	29 November 1969	1992	Transferred on 29 November 1969. Sold to the Philippines in 1980. Decommissioned in 1992, probably sold as scrap		
LST-1 class	BRP Mindoro Occidental / RPS Mindoro Occidental	USS LST-222 / USS LST(H)-222	LT-93	15 July 1972	unknown	Still in service as of 1989. Probably sold as scrap early 1990s		
LST-1 class	BRP Surigao del Norte / RPS Surigao del Norte	USS LST-488 / USS LST(H)-488	LT-94	15 July 1972	unknown	Still in service as of 1989. Probably sold as scrap early 1990s		
LST-542 class	BRP Surigao del Sur / RPS Surigao del Sur	USS LST-546	LT-95	15 July 1972	1988	Sold for scrap		
LST-491 class	BRP Cotabato del Sur	USS LST-529 / USS Cayuga County (LST-529) / RVNS Thi Nai (HQ-502)	LT-87	17 November 1975	7 June 2001	Scrapped in 2003		
LST-542 class	BRP Agusan del Sur	USS LST-848 / USS Jerome County (LST-848) / RVNS Nha Trang (HQ-505)	LT-54	April 1975	1986	Sold for scrap in 1992.		
LST-542 class	BRP Sierra Madre	USS LST-821 / USS Harnett County (LST-821) / RVNS My Tho (HQ-800)	LT-57	5 April 1976	1999	Aground near Ayungin Shoal (Second Thomas Shoal), Kalayaan Islands as an outpost. Treated as a ship still in active service.		
LST-491 class	BRP Zamboanga del Sur	USS LST-975 / USS Marion County (LST-975)	LT-86	17 November 1975	between 2013 and 2014	Hulk was being tendered as of March 7, 2014.		
LST-1 class	BRP Tarlac	USS LST-47	LT-500	13 September 1976	unknown	Stricken prior to 1990		
LST-1 class	BRP Samar Oriental	USS LST-287	LT-502	13 September 1976	unknown			
LST-491 class	BRP Lanao del Sur	USS LST-491	LT-503	13 September 1976	1988	Converted to commercial barge after 1988		
LST-542 class	BRP Lanao del Norte	USS LST-566	LT-504	13 September 1976	unknown	Aground and abandoned near Pag-Asa Island, Kalayaan Islands		
LST-542 class	BRP Leyte del Sur	USS LST-607	LT-505	13 September 1976	unknown	Stricken prior to 1990		
LST-542 class	BRP Davao Oriental	USS LST-689 / USS Daggett County (LST-689) / JDS Oosumi (LST-4001)	LT-506	1975	after 1993	Sold as scrap after 1993		
LST-542 class	BRP Aurora	USS LST-822 / USNS Harris County (T-LST-822)	LT-508	13 September 1976				
LST-542 class	BRP Cavite	USS LST-835 / USS Hillsdale County (LST-835) / JDS Shimokita (LST-4002)	LT-509	13 September 1976	1989	Sold as scrap in 1989		
LST-542 class	BRP Samar del Norte	USS LST-1064 / USS Nansemond County (LST-1064) / JDS Shiretoko (LST-4003)	LT-510	24 September 1976				
LST-542 class	BRP Cotabato del Norte	USS LST-1096 / USS Orleans Parish (LST-1096) / USS Orleans Parish (MSC-6)	LT-511	1 September 1976	unknown			
LST-542 class	BRP Tawi-Tawi	USS LST-1072	LT-512	13 September 1976	unknown	Sold for scrap, date unknown		
LST-542 class	BRP Kalinga Apayao	USS LST-786 / USS Garrett County (LST-786) / USS Garrett County (AGP-786) / RVNS Can Tho (HQ-801)	LT-516	1975	September 2010	partially beached at Naval Base Cavite		

=== Landing Ship Medium ===
Name	Previous names	Pennant	Previous pennant	Commissioned	Decommissioned	Fate	Photo	Notes
LSM-1 class / Batanes class
RPS Batanes (I)	USS LSM-236	LP-65	L-65	15 September 1960	1972	Ran aground June 1971 and declared a total loss, stricken 1972		
BRP Isabela	USS LSM-463, RPS Isabela (LP-41)	LP-41	-	17 March 1961	1989?	Hulk disposed as of 1989		
BRP Oriental Mindoro	USS LSM-320, RPS Oriental Mindoro (LP-68)	LP-68	-	27 April 1962	1989?	Hulk disposed as of 1989		
BRP Batanes (II)	USS LSM-175 / USS Oceanside (LSM-175) / RVNS Huong Giang (HQ-404), RPS Batanes (II) (LD-65)	LP-65	-	7 February 1977	1988	Acquired 17 November 1975, commissioned 7 February 1977 using same name and pennant number of similar ship that ran aground in 1971. Hulk disposed as of 1989.		
Note: One ship of the class, the BRP Western Samar (LP-66) (former USS LSM-355) was converted to a hospital ship. Another ship of the class, the former USS LSM-110 was transferred to the Philippine Navy but did not enter service, was cannibalized for spare parts for its other operational sisterships.

=== Landing Craft ===
Class	Name	Previous names	Pennant	Commissioned	Decommissioned	Fate	Photo	Notes
LCU Mark 6 class	??		AT-287			Submerged derelict hull located at Varadero de Recodo, Zamboanga City as of 2011.		
LCU Mark 6 class	BRP Manobo		AT-297			Derelict hull located at Varadero de Cawit, Zamboanga City as of 2011. Not to be mixed up with the now active BRP Manobo (BU-297) which is a Philippine-made LCU acquired in 2011.		

=== Landing Craft / Ship Support (Large) ===
Name	Previous names	Pennant	Previous pennant	Commissioned	Decommissioned	Fate	Photo	Notes
LCS(L)(3)-1 class
BRP Camarines Sur	USS LCS(L)(3)-129 / USS LSSL-129, JDS Botan, RVNS Nguyen Duc Bong (HQ-231), RPS Camarines Sur (LF-48)	LF-48	-	7 February 1977	unknown	unknown, probably sold for scrap		
BRP Sulu	USS LCS(L)(3)-96 / USS LSSL-96, JDS Shobu, RVNS Nguyen Ngoc Long (HQ-230), RPS Sulu (LF-49)	LF-49	-	7 February 1977	early 1980s	probably sold for scrap		
BRP La Union	USS LCS(L)(3)-9 / USS LSSL-9, RPS La Union (LF-50)	LF-50	-	1975	late 1980s	probably sold for scrap		

== Auxiliary ships ==
Survey Ships- First Postwar Ships of the Offshore Patrol by CDR Mark R Condeno, Rough Deck Log issue, October 2022 issue, Philippine Navy Civil Military Operations Group Most of the Survey Ships and Lighthouse Tenders Transferred retained their American Names and Numbers until 11 February 1953,

Name	Previous names	Pennant	Previous pennant	Commissioned	Decommissioned	Fate	Photo	Notes
PCS-1376 class
	USS Armistead Rust (AGS-9) / USS PCS-1404	??	-	4 July 1948	unknown	Fate unknown, probably transferred to Philippine Coast and Geodetic Survey.		
Manzanita class
	USCGC Anemone (WAGL 202) / USS Anemone / USLHT Anemone	?	-	1 April 1947	unknown			
	USCGC Orchid (WAGL-240)	?	-	1 December 1945	1948	Served as presidential yacht until 1948		
	USCGC Sequoia (WAGL-240) / USS Sequoia / USLHT Sequoia	?	-	1 July 1947	unknown	Fate unknown, probably transferred to Philippine Coast and Geodetic Survey.		
	USCGC Tulip (WAGL-249)	?	-	5 July 1947	unknown	Fate unknown, probably transferred to Philippine Coast and Geodetic Survey.		
Speedwell class
RPS Lupine	USCGC Anemone (WAGL 202) / USS Anemone / USLHT Anemone	?	-	1 April 1947	unknown	Fate unknown, probably transferred to Philippine Coast and Geodetic Survey.		

=== Hospital Ships / Floating Clinics ===
Name	Previous names	Pennant	Previous pennant	Commissioned	Decommissioned	Fate	Photo	Notes
Benewah class
RPS Hospital ng Tulungan	USS Benewah (APB-35)	AW-3	-	19 March 1975	1975	Acquired 1 May 1974 for conversion to hospital ship. Damaged by fire on 8 August 1975. Still floating off Tacloban City as of 18 February 1990, probably sold for scrap.		
LSM-1 class / Batanes class
BRP Western Samar	USS LSM-355, FS L 9011, RVNS Hat Giang (HQ-400), RPS Western Samar (LP-66)	LP-66	-	1975	1989	Acquired 17 November 1975. Fitted as a hospital ship. Sold in 1989 to a private company and converted to merchant marine ship Pacific Challenger. Fate unknown.		
LCU Mk.6 class
RPS Bagong Pilipino			TK-81					
RPS Dakila	??		TK-82	1969	unknown			
RPS Pag-ibig	??		BU-81	unknown	unknown			

=== Supply Ship ===
Name	Previous names	Pennant	Previous pennant	Commissioned	Decommissioned	Fate	Photo	Notes
Alamosa class
BRP Mactan	USS Colquitt (AK-174), USCGC Kukui (WAK-186), RPS Mactan (TK-90)	AC-90	TK-90	1 March 1972	7 June 2001	Decommissioned, probably sold for scrap		

=== Water Tanker ===
Name	Previous names	Pennant	Previous pennant	Commissioned	Decommissioned	Fate	Photo	Notes
YW-83 class / Lake Lanao class
BRP Lake Lanao	USS YW-125, RPS Lake Lanao (Y-42) / RPS Lake Lanao (YW-42)	AW-42	YW-42 / Y-42	July 1948	1989	stricken by 1989		
BRP Lake Buluan	USS YW-111, RPS Lake Buluan (YW-33)	AW-33	YW-33	16 July 1975				
BRP Lake Paoay	USS YW-130, RPS Lake Paoay (YW-34)	AW-34	YW-34	16 July 1975	November 2007			

=== Tankers ===
Name	Previous names	Pennant	Previous pennant	Commissioned	Decommissioned	Fate	Photo	Notes
Lake Taal class
RPS Lake Taal	USS YOG-???	Y-41	Y-19	1948?	1956	Decommissioned in 1956 due to poor condition		
Lake Mainit class
RPS Lake Mainit	USS YOG-???	YO-35				stricken by 1979		
BRP Lake Naujan	USS YOG-173, RPS Lake Naujan (YO-43)	YO-43	Y-43	1948	1983	stricken by 1989		
BRP Lake Taal	USS YOG-??, RPS Lake Taal (YO-72)	AF-72	YO-72		2015	Being tendered for disposal as of November 2015.		
Lake Caliraya class
BRP Lake Caliraya	MT PNOC Lapu-Lapu	AF-81	-	23 May 2015	17 December 2020	Donated by the Philippine National Oil Company in 2015. Decommissioned from the PN early after encountering several issues that made the ship unsafe to operate, despite numerous attempts to repair it. Disposed by being designated as a SINKEX target in the Balikatan Exercises in 2024, at the South China Sea.		

=== Repair Ship ===
Name	Previous names	Pennant	Previous pennant	Commissioned	Decommissioned	Fate	Photo	Notes
Achelous class / Aklan class
BRP Kamagong	USS LST-962 / USS Romulus (ARL-22), RPS Aklan (AR-67) / RPS Kamagong (AR-67)	AR-67	-	November 1961	1989?	Name changed in 1970s to follow new ship naming and classifications standard. Scrapped in 1989.		
BRP Narra	USS LST-1149 / USS Krishna (ARL-38), RPS Narra (AR-88)	AR-88	-	30 October 1971	1990s?	Exact decommissioning ate unknown, probably 1990s. Probably sold for scrap.		
BRP Yakal	USS LST-852 / USS Satyr (ARL-23), RPS Yakal (ARL-517) / BRP Yakal (ARL-716)	AD-617	ARL-517 / ARL-617	24 January 1977		Still active as of 2015.		

=== Command Ships / Yachts ===
Name	Previous names	Pennant	Previous pennant	Commissioned	Decommissioned	Fate	Photo	Notes
Admirable class
BRP Mount Samat	USS Quest (AM-281), RPS APO (21) / RPS Santa Maria (TK-21) / RPS Pagasa (TK-21) / RPS Mount Samat (TP-21)	TP-21	TK-21 / 21	4 July 1948	1993	Renamed as RPS Mount Samat in 1967. Used as command ship and presidential yacht from 1940s to 1980s, and as a supply ships from late 1980s. Sank on 21 September 1993 while berthed at Sangley Point during the height of Typhoon Dot / Anding.		

=== Tug Boats ===
Name	Previous names	Pennant	Previous pennant	Commissioned	Decommissioned	Fate	Photo	Notes
ATR-1 class / Favourite class
RPS Ifugao	USS ATR-96 / HMS Emphatic (W 154)	AQ-44	?	July 1948	1979			
422 class
RPS Maranao	USS YTL-554	YQ-221	?	2 July 1948	unknown			
RPS Igorot	USS YTL-572	YQ-222	?	2 July 1948	unknown			
