= USS LST-865 =

LST-542-class landing ship tank

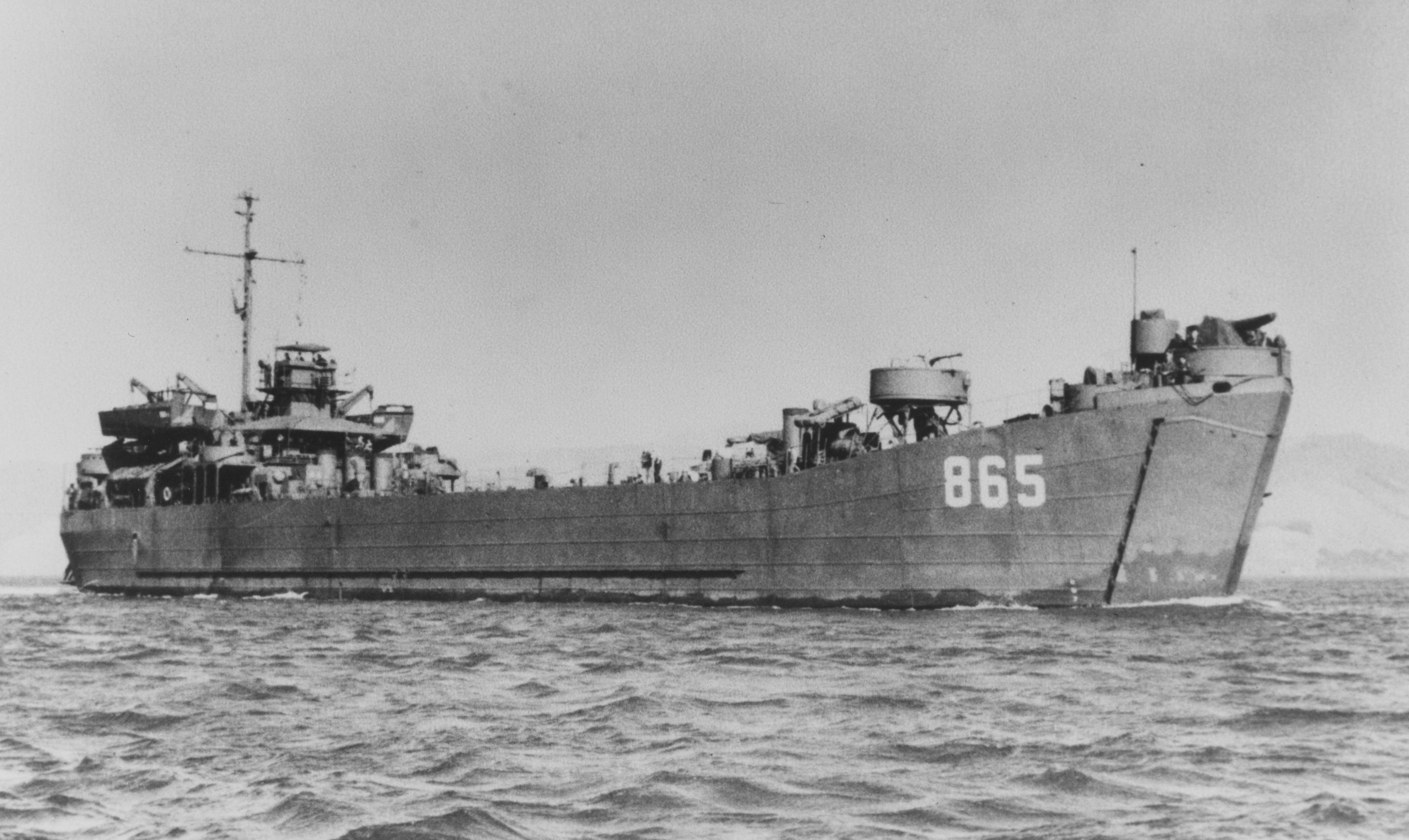
- USS LST-865

History

United States
- Name: LST-865
- Builder: Jeffersonville Boat and Machine Co., Jeffersonville
- Laid down: 19 October 1944
- Launched: 22 November 1944
- Sponsored by: Mrs. Monetta S. Brendel
- Commissioned: 16 December 1944
- Decommissioned: 30 December 1947
- Stricken: 22 January 1948
- Identification: Callsign: NIUI
- Honors and awards: See Awards
- Fate: Transferred to Philippines, 30 December 1976

Philippines
- Name: Albay
- Namesake: Albay
- Acquired: 30 December 1976
- Commissioned: 30 December 1976
- Decommissioned: 1979
- Reclassified: LT-39
- Identification: Hull number: T-39
- Fate: Scrapped

General characteristics
- Class & type: LST-542-class tank landing ship
- Displacement: 1,625 long tons (1,651 t) (light); 4,080 long tons (4,145 t) (full (seagoing draft with 1,675 short tons (1,520 t) load); 2,366 long tons (2,404 t) (beaching)
- Length: 328 ft (100 m) oa
- Beam: 50 ft (15 m)
- Draft: Unloaded: 2 ft 4 in (0.71 m) forward; 7 ft 6 in (2.29 m) aft; Full load: 8 ft 3 in (2.51 m) forward; 14 ft 1 in (4.29 m) aft; Landing with 500 short tons (450 t) load: 3 ft 11 in (1.19 m) forward; 9 ft 10 in (3.00 m) aft; Limiting 11 ft 2 in (3.40 m); Maximum navigation 14 ft 1 in (4.29 m)
- Installed power: 2 × 900 hp (670 kW) Electro-Motive Diesel 12-567A diesel engines; 1,800 shp (1,300 kW)
- Propulsion: 1 × Falk main reduction gears; 2 × Propellers
- Speed: 11.6 kn (21.5 km/h; 13.3 mph)
- Range: 24,000 nmi (44,000 km; 28,000 mi) at 9 kn (17 km/h; 10 mph) while displacing 3,960 long tons (4,024 t)
- Boats & landing craft carried: 2 x LCVPs
- Capacity: 1,600–1,900 short tons (3,200,000–3,800,000 lb; 1,500,000–1,700,000 kg) cargo depending on mission
- Troops: 16 officers, 147 enlisted men
- Complement: 7 officers, 104 enlisted men
- Armament: Varied, ultimate armament; 2 × twin 40 mm (1.57 in) Bofors guns; 4 × single 40 mm Bofors guns; 12 × 20 mm (0.79 in) Oerlikon cannons

USS LST-865 was a LST-542-class tank landing ship in the United States Navy during World War II. She was transferred to the Philippine Navy as RPS Albay (T-39).

== Construction and career ==
LST-865 was laid down on 19 October 1944 at Jeffersonville Boat and Machine Co., Jeffersonville, Indiana. Launched on 22 November 1944 and commissioned on 16 December 1944.

=== Service in the United States Navy ===
During World War II, LST-865 was assigned to the Asiatic-Pacific theater. She was assigned to occupation and Far East from 3 September to 15 December 1947.

She was decommissioned on 30 Decommissioned 1947.

LST-865 was struck from the Navy Register on 22 January 1948 and transferred to the Philippines.

=== Service in the Philippine Navy ===
She was acquired by the Philippine Navy on 30 December 1976 and renamed RPS Albay (T-39).

During the Korean War, RPS Cotabato, RPS Pampanga, RPS Bulacan, BRP Albay, and BRP Misamis Oriental had been sent to transport Filipino soldiers to and from Korea for five years. Albay and Bulacan conducted anti-aircraft and anti-submarine drills with a U.S. Navy submarine which surfaced next to Albay. Both ships then anchored at the Port of Busan, 12 days after they departed Manila. She made trips from 1953 to 1954 carrying troops to and back from Korea.

On 19 April 1974, a 20-day marathon on bicycles named Tour of Luzon-Visayas with 200 participants boarded the ship at South Harbor in order to continue the marathon in Tolosa.

RPS Albay, Bulacan and Misamis Oriental were all mothballed in 1979.

== Awards ==
LST-865 have earned the following awards:

- American Campaign Medal
- Asiatic-Pacific Campaign Medal (1 battle star)
- World War II Victory Medal
- Navy Occupation Service Medal (with Asia clasp)
- China Service Medal (extended)

== Sources ==
- United States. Dept. of the Treasury (1962). Treasury Decisions Under the Customs, Internal Revenue, Industrial Alcohol, Narcotic and Other Laws, Volume 97. U.S. Government Printing Office.
- Moore, Capt. John (1984). Jane's Fighting Ships 1984-85. Jane's Information Group. ISBN 978-0710607959.
- Saunders, Stephen (2009). Jane's Fighting Ships 2009-2010. Jane's Information Group. ISBN 978-0710628886.
- Fairplay International Shipping Journal Volume 222. United Kingdom: Fairplay Publishing Limited. 1967.
