= USS LST-287 =

LST-1-class landing ship tank

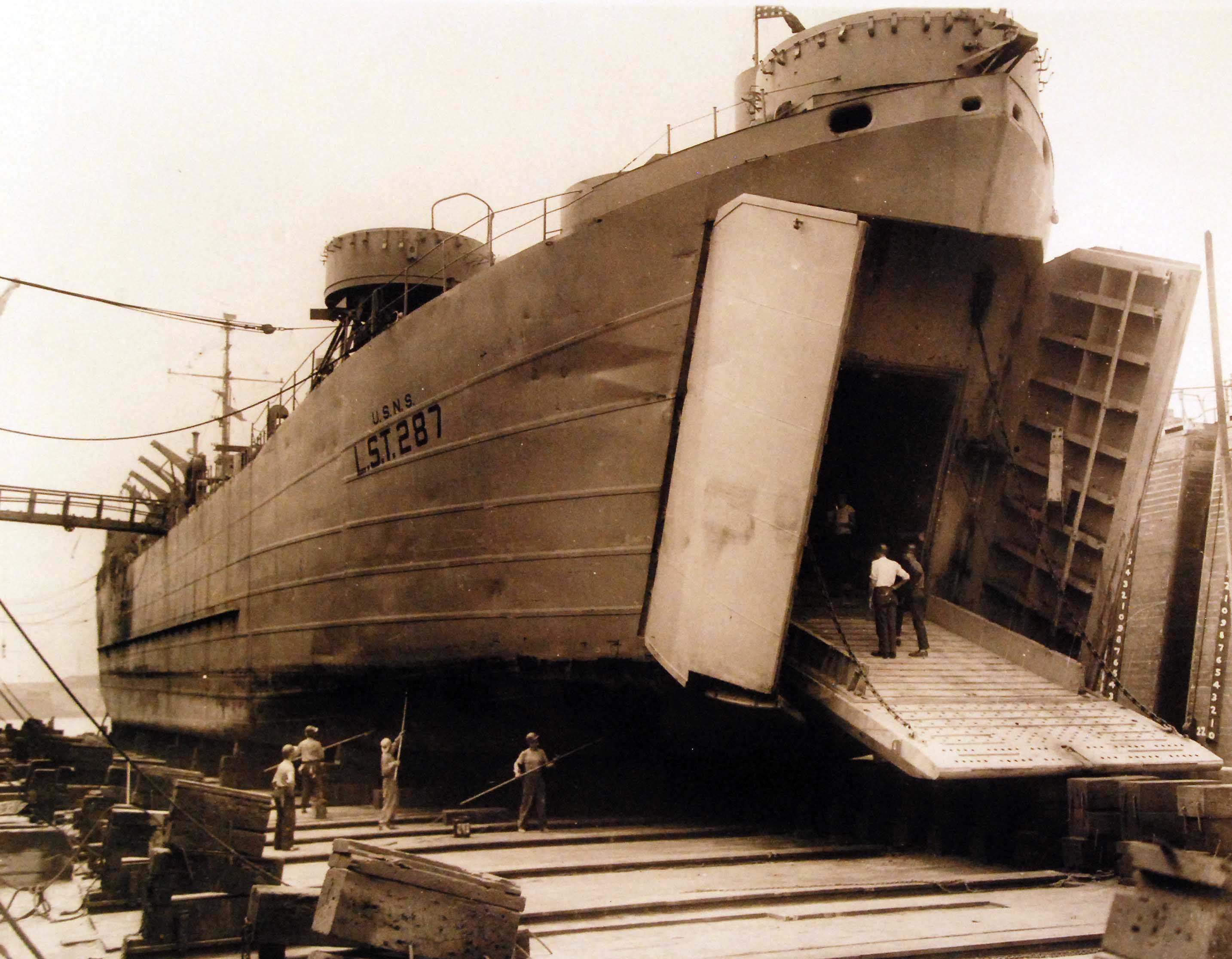
- USS T-LST-287 on 25 August 1953

History

United States
- Name: LST-287
- Builder: American Bridge Co., Ambridge
- Laid down: 30 August 1943
- Launched: 31 October 1943
- Sponsored by: Mrs. Agnes Johnston
- Commissioned: 15 December 1943
- Decommissioned: 13 June 1946
- Reclassified: T-LST-287, 29 May 1951
- Identification: Callsign: NGCA
- Honors and awards: See Awards
- Fate: Transferred to Philippines, 13 September 1976

Philippines
- Name: Samar Oriental
- Namesake: Samar Oriental
- Acquired: 13 September 1976
- Commissioned: 13 September 1976
- Decommissioned: 1992
- Stricken: 1992
- Identification: Hull number: LT-502
- Fate: Scrapped

General characteristics
- Class & type: LST-1-class tank landing ship
- Displacement: 4,080 long tons (4,145 t) full load; 2,160 long tons (2,190 t) landing
- Length: 328 ft (100 m) oa
- Beam: 50 ft (15 m)
- Draft: Full load: 8 ft 2 in (2.49 m) forward; 14 ft 1 in (4.29 m) aft; Landing at 2,160 t: 3 ft 11 in (1.19 m) forward; 9 ft 10 in (3.00 m) aft
- Installed power: 2 × 900 hp (670 kW) Electro-Motive Diesel 12-567A diesel engines; 1,700 shp (1,300 kW)
- Propulsion: 1 × Falk main reduction gears; 2 × Propellers
- Speed: 12 kn (22 km/h; 14 mph)
- Range: 24,000 nmi (44,000 km; 28,000 mi) at 9 kn (17 km/h; 10 mph) while displacing 3,960 long tons (4,024 t)
- Boats & landing craft carried: 2 or 6 x LCVPs
- Capacity: 2,100 tons oceangoing maximum; 350 tons main deckload
- Troops: 16 officers, 147 enlisted men
- Complement: 13 officers, 104 enlisted men
- Armament: Varied, ultimate armament; 2 × twin 40 mm (1.57 in) Bofors guns; 4 × single 40 mm Bofors guns; 12 × 20 mm (0.79 in) Oerlikon cannons

USS LST-287 was a LST-1-class tank landing ship in the United States Navy during World War II. She was transferred to the Philippine Navy as RPS Samar Oriental (LT-502).

== Construction and career ==
LST-287 was laid down on 30 August 1943 at American Bridge Co., Ambridge, Pennsylvania. Launched on 31 October 1943 and commissioned on 15 December 1943.

=== Service in the United States Navy ===
During World War II, LST-287 was assigned to the Europe-Africa-Middle East theater. She then participated in the Invasion of Normandy from 6 to 25 June 1944.

She was decommissioned on 13 June 1946.

Transferred to the Military Sea Transportation Service (MSTS), 29 May 1951, and placed in service as USNS T-LST-287.

On 19 August 1953, she and the United States Army tug LT-1953 extinguished a fire on the abandoned Danish cargo ship Else Basse. They subsequently towed her in to St. Georges Bay.

LST-287 was struck from the Navy Register and transferred to the Philippines.

=== Service in the Philippine Navy ===
She was acquired by the Philippine Navy on 13 September 1976 and renamed RPS Samar Oriental (LT-502).

On 19 April 1974, a 20-day marathon on bicycles named Tour of Luzon-Visayas with 200 participants boarded the ship at South Harbor in order to continue the marathon in Tolosa.

BRP Samar Oriental was moored at Poro Point, La Union, Luzon Island on 2 September 1991.

In 1992, BRP Ilocos Norte (LT-98), BRP Samar Oriental (LT-502), and BRP Tawi-Tawi (LT-512) were stricken.

== Awards ==
LST-287 have earned the following awards:

- American Campaign Medal
- Europe-Africa-Middle East Campaign Medal (1 battle star)
- World War II Victory Medal

== Sources ==
- United States. Dept. of the Treasury (1962). Treasury Decisions Under the Customs, Internal Revenue, Industrial Alcohol, Narcotic and Other Laws, Volume 97. U.S. Government Printing Office.
- Moore, Capt. John (1984). Jane's Fighting Ships 1984-85. Jane's Information Group. ISBN 978-0710607959.
- Saunders, Stephen (2009). Jane's Fighting Ships 2009-2010. Jane's Information Group. ISBN 978-0710628886.
- Fairplay International Shipping Journal Volume 222. United Kingdom: Fairplay Publishing Limited. 1967.
