= Cotabato (disambiguation) =

Cotabato, formerly and still colloquially known as North Cotabato, is a province in the Philippines.

Cotabato may also refer to:

- Cotabato (historical province), a historical province of the Philippines (1914–1973)
- Cotabato City, an independent city geographically located in Maguindanao del Norte, Philippines
- Roman Catholic Archdiocese of Cotabato, an archdiocese on the island of Mindanao, Philippines
- South Cotabato, a province in the Philippines
- "Cotabato", a folk OPM song by Asin

== See also ==
- RPS Cotabato (T-36), a ship of the Philippine navy
