= USS LST-75 =

LST-1-class landing ship tank

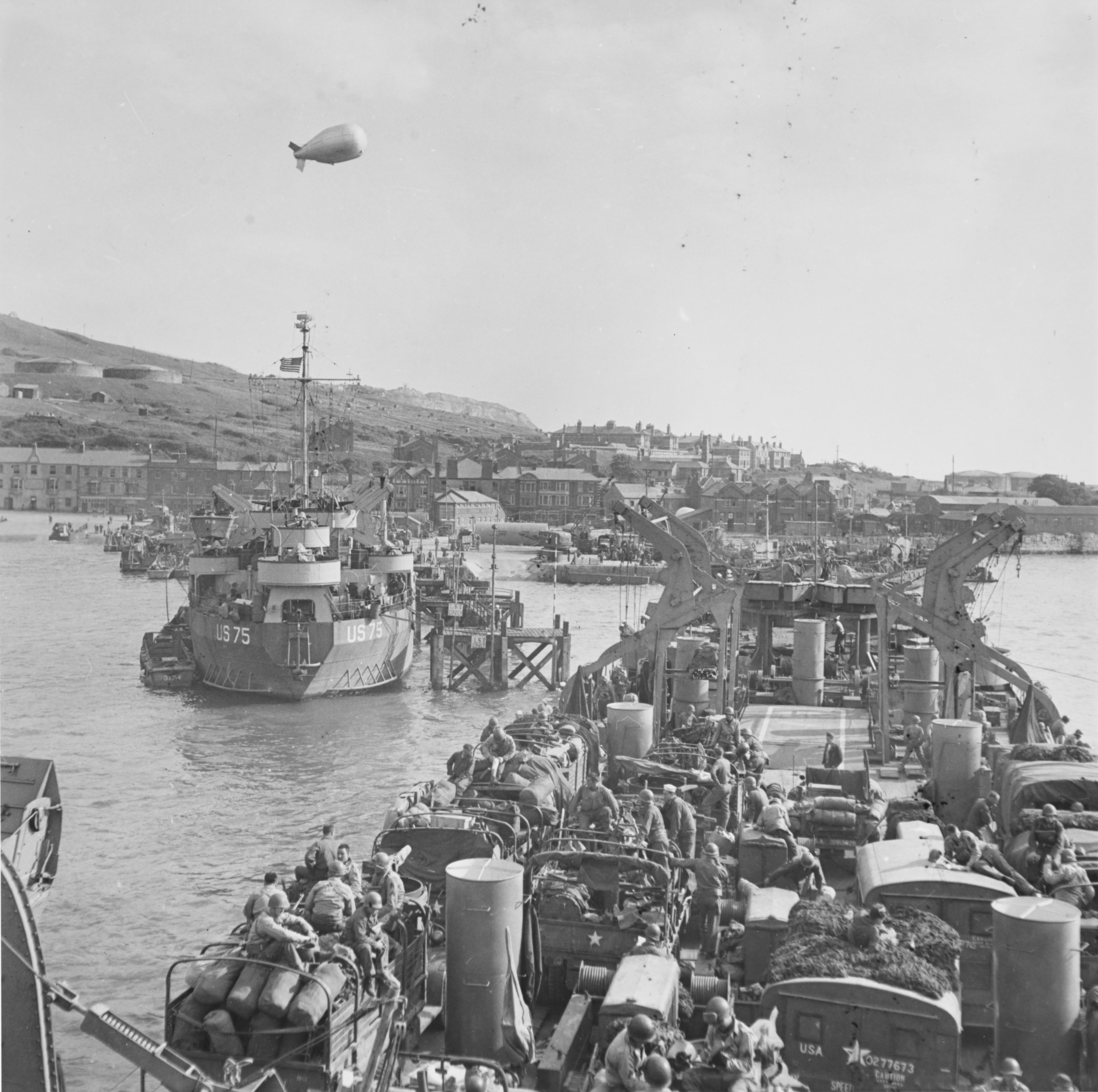
- USS LST-75 on 2 June 1944

History

United States
- Name: LST-75
- Builder: Jeffersonville Boat & Machine Co., Jeffersonville
- Laid down: 30 January 1943
- Launched: 7 April 1943
- Sponsored by: Mrs. Dorsey W. Brown
- Commissioned: 21 June 1943
- Decommissioned: 22 December 1947
- Stricken: 22 January 1948
- Identification: Callsign: NZEV
- Honors and awards: See Awards
- Fate: Transferred to Philippines, 30 December 1947

Philippines
- Name: Cotabato
- Namesake: Cotabato
- Acquired: 22 January 1948
- Decommissioned: 1978
- Reclassified: LT-36
- Identification: Hull number: T-36
- Fate: Scrapped

General characteristics
- Class & type: LST-1-class tank landing ship
- Displacement: 4,080 long tons (4,145 t) full load; 2,160 long tons (2,190 t) landing
- Length: 328 ft (100 m) oa
- Beam: 50 ft (15 m)
- Draft: Full load: 8 ft 2 in (2.49 m) forward; 14 ft 1 in (4.29 m) aft; Landing at 2,160 t: 3 ft 11 in (1.19 m) forward; 9 ft 10 in (3.00 m) aft
- Installed power: 2 × 900 hp (670 kW) Electro-Motive Diesel 12-567A diesel engines; 1,700 shp (1,300 kW)
- Propulsion: 1 × Falk main reduction gears; 2 × Propellers
- Speed: 12 kn (22 km/h; 14 mph)
- Range: 24,000 nmi (44,000 km; 28,000 mi) at 9 kn (17 km/h; 10 mph) while displacing 3,960 long tons (4,024 t)
- Boats & landing craft carried: 2 or 6 x LCVPs
- Capacity: 2,100 tons oceangoing maximum; 350 tons main deckload
- Troops: 16 officers, 147 enlisted men
- Complement: 13 officers, 104 enlisted men
- Armament: Varied, ultimate armament; 2 × twin 40 mm (1.57 in) Bofors guns; 4 × single 40 mm Bofors guns; 12 × 20 mm (0.79 in) Oerlikon cannons

USS LST-75 was a LST-1-class tank landing ship in the United States Navy during World War II. In early 1948, She was transferred to the Philippine Navy as RPS Cotabato (T-36).

== Construction and career ==
LST-75 was laid down on 30 January 1943 at Jeffersonville Boat & Machine Co., Jeffersonville, Indiana. Launched on 7 April 1943 and commissioned on 21 June 1943.

=== Service in the United States Navy ===
During World War II, LST-75 was assigned to the Europe-Africa-Middle East theater. She then participated in the Invasion of Normandy from 6 to 25 June 1944.

She participated in the invasion of Okinawa and later took occupation there from 26 to 30 June 1945. She assigned to Occupation service in the Far East from 19 November to 11 December 1945 and 5 July to 2 August 1947.

She was decommissioned on 22 December 1947.

LST-75 was struck from the Navy Register on 22 January 1948 and transferred to the Philippines.

=== Service in the Philippine Navy ===
She was acquired by the Philippine Navy on 22 January 1948 and renamed RPS Cotabato (T-36).

During the Korean War, RPS Cotabato (T-36), RPS Pampanga (T-37), RPS Bulacan (T-38), BRP Albay (T-39), and RPS Misamis Oriental (T-40) had been sent to transport Filipino soldiers to and from Korea for five years.

In September 1951 both Cotabato and Pampanga under CDR Tomas C. Robenul, PN would again undertake the task of bringing the second Filipino battalion the 20th BCT under Col. Salvador Abcede to the Korean theater of operations.

On 23 October 1951, Cotabato escorted by a pair of submarine chasers entered Manila Bay with a tumultuous welcome from surrounding ships, a flyby from a formation of P-51 Mustangs of the PAF, and a jubilant crowd.

Cotabato and Pampanga were decommissioned in early 1978.

== Awards ==
LST-75 have earned the following awards:

- American Campaign Medal
- Combat Action Ribbon
- European-Africa-Middle East Campaign Medal (1 battle star)
- Asiatic-Pacific Campaign Medal
- Navy Occupation Medal (with Asia clasp)
- World War II Victory Medal

== Sources ==
- United States. Dept. of the Treasury (1962). Treasury Decisions Under the Customs, Internal Revenue, Industrial Alcohol, Narcotic and Other Laws, Volume 97. U.S. Government Printing Office.
- Moore, Capt. John (1984). Jane's Fighting Ships 1984-85. Jane's Information Group. ISBN 978-0710607959.
- Saunders, Stephen (2009). Jane's Fighting Ships 2009-2010. Jane's Information Group. ISBN 978-0710628886.
- Fairplay International Shipping Journal Volume 222. United Kingdom: Fairplay Publishing Limited. 1967.
