= De Havilland 9209-class patrol craft =

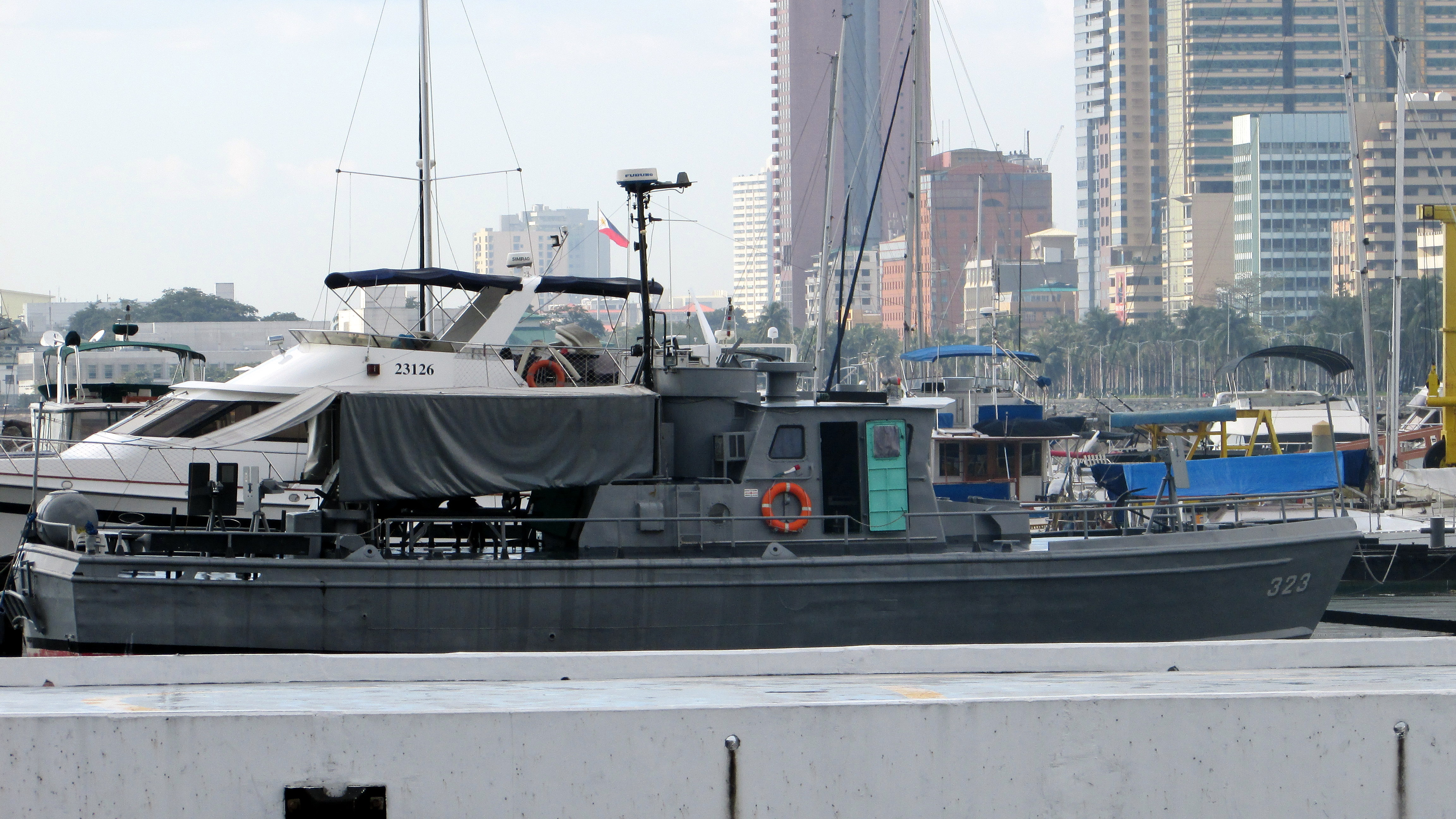
- DF-323, one of the De Havilland 9209-class patrol craft

Class overview
- Builders: De Havilland Marine Australia
- Operators: Philippine Navy
- Built: mid 1980s
- In commission: mid 1980s-present
- Active: 0
- Retired: 6

General characteristics
- Type: Coastal Patrol Craft
- Displacement: 25 tons full load
- Length: 54.8 ft 10 in (16.96 m)
- Beam: 16.4 ft 7 in (5.18 m)
- Draft: 4.3 ft (1.3 m)c
- Propulsion: 2 × Cummins Diesel Engines at 740 hp (550 kW) total; 2 shafts
- Speed: 25 knots (46 km/h) maximum
- Range: 500 nmi (930 km) at 12 knots (22 km/h)
- Complement: 8
- Sensors & processing systems: Furuno Navigation / Surface Search Radar
- Armament: 2 × M2HB Browning 12.7 mm/50-cal. heavy machine guns; 1 × M60 7.62mm general purpose machine gun
- Aircraft carried: none
- Aviation facilities: none

The De Havilland 9209-class was a coastal patrol boat class that served with the Philippine Navy. They are usually assigned on coastal patrol, mostly around Manila Bay area for harbor and naval base security, as well as security during events in Manila.

The boats were built by De Havilland Marine of New South Wales, Australia, and were delivered in the mid 1980s.

It was initially designated as Small Patrol Craft with a hull initial "DF", but later on was re-designated as a Yard Patrol Craft, and was finally re-designated as "PC".

The entire class was deactivated from Philippine Navy service on 17 December 2020, and are scheduled to be replaced with newer boats, most likely versions of the Multi-Purpose Attack Craft (MPAC).

== Ships in Class ==
Bow number	Commissioned	Service	Status
PC-317	mid 1980s	Philippine Navy Littoral Combat Force	Deactivated 17 December 2020
PC-319	mid 1980s	Philippine Navy Littoral Combat Force	Status unknown
PC-320	mid 1980s	Philippine Navy Littoral Combat Force	Deactivated 17 December 2020
PC-321	mid 1980s	Philippine Navy Littoral Combat Force	Deactivated 17 December 2020
PC-322	mid 1980s	Philippine Navy Littoral Combat Force	Deactivated 17 December 2020
PC-323	mid 1980s	Philippine Navy Littoral Combat Force	Deactivated 17 December 2020

== Gallery ==
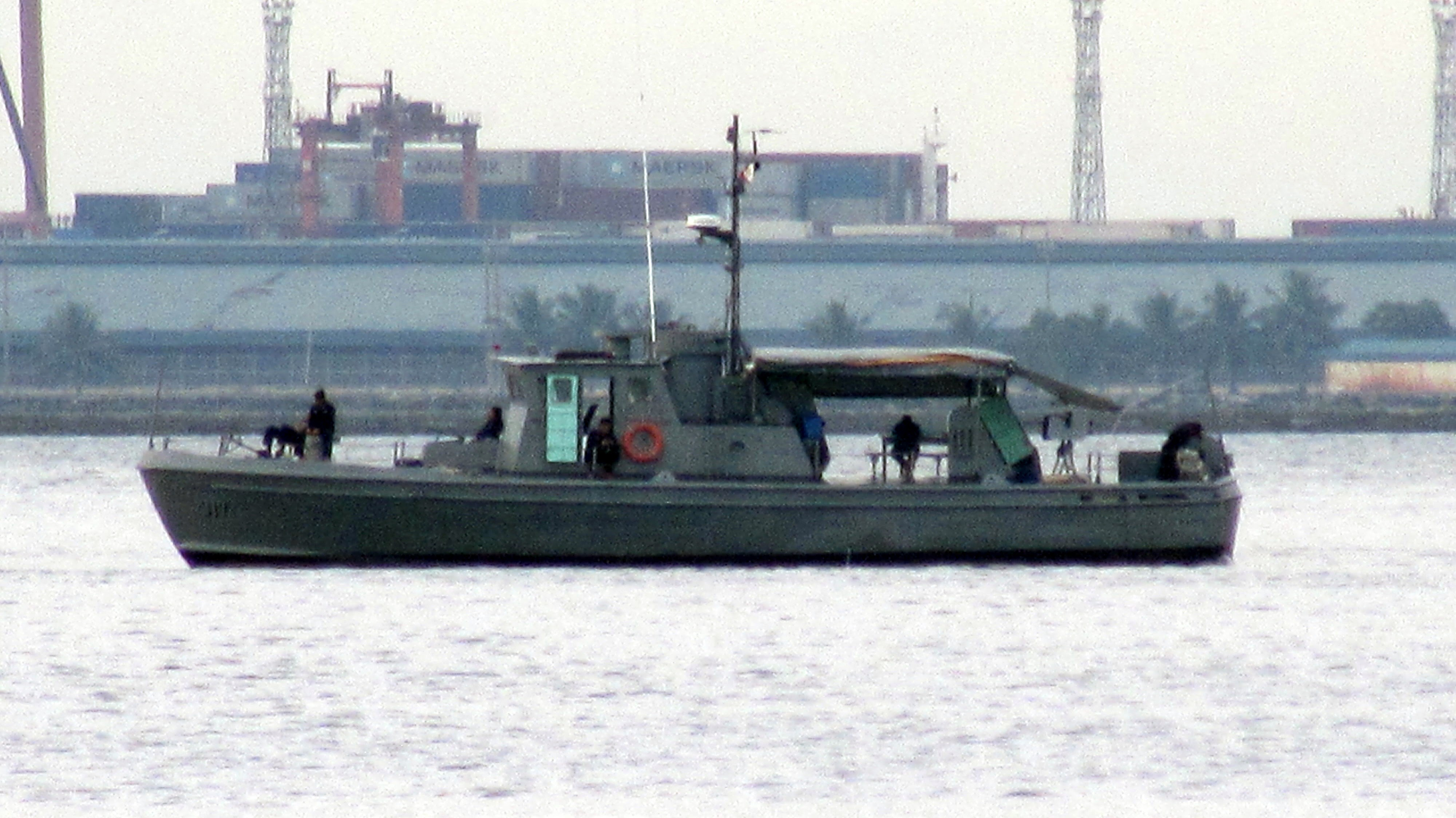

== See also ==
- List of decommissioned ships of the Philippine Navy
