= SS Dr. Heinrich Wiegand =

Steam ship

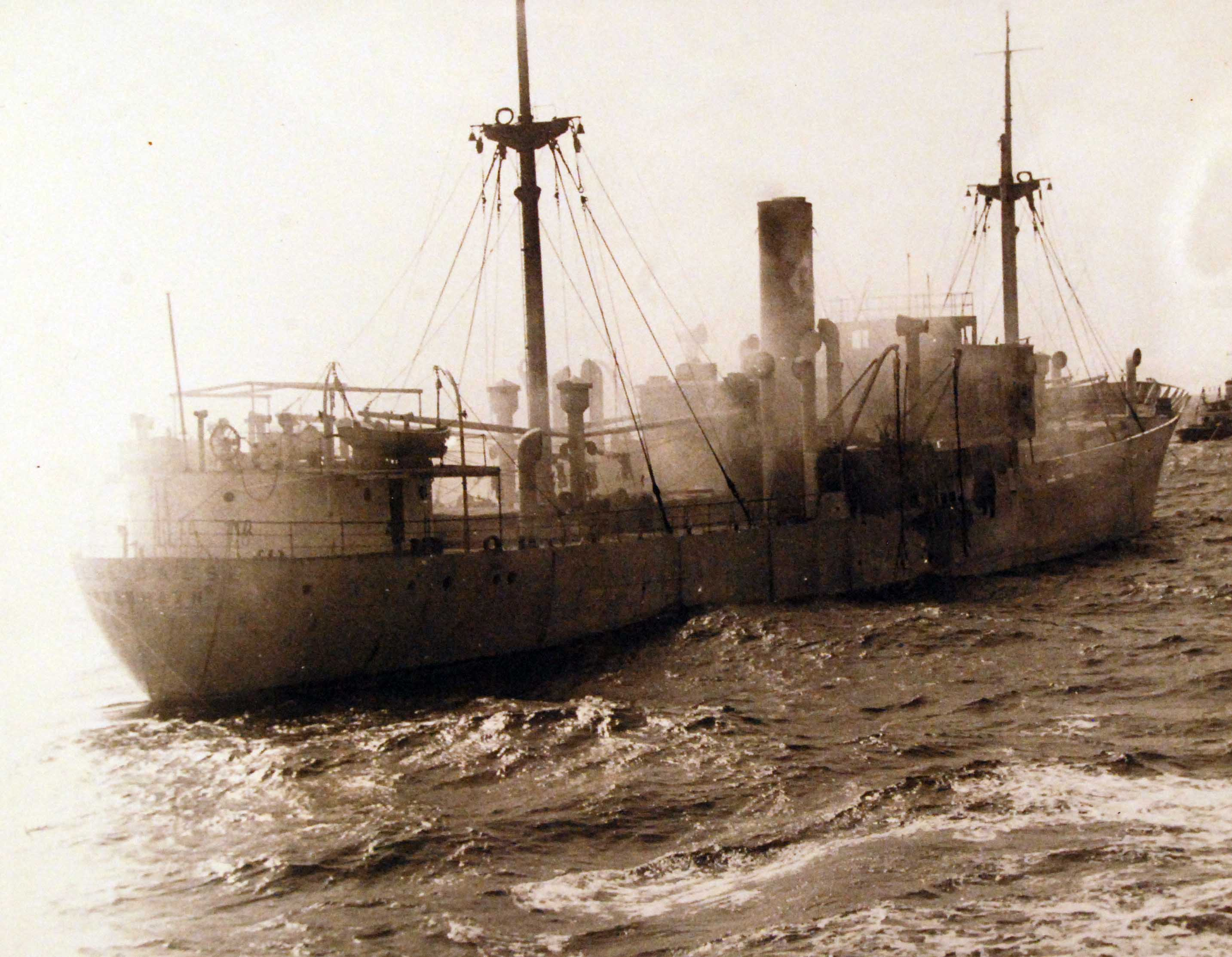
- Else Basse burning, 25 August 1953.

History
- Name: Dr. Heinrich Wiegand (1938–49); Else Basse (1949–55); Kaarina (1955–68)
- Namesake: Heinrich Wiegand (1938–49); Kaarina (1954–68)
- Owner: Argo Line (1938–39); Kriegsmarine (1939–44); United States Maritime Commission (1946–48); Seatrade Corporation (1948–49); AS Hetland (1949–54); Oy Suomi Shipping Ab – Finska Fiskeri Ab (1954–56); Suomen Kalastus Oy (1957–64)
- Operator: Owner operated except-; Ab R. Nordström & Co., Oy (1955–61)
- Port of registry: (Nazi Germany) Bremen, Germany (1938–39); Kriegsmarine (1939–45); United States (1946–49); Copenhagen, Denmark (1949–54); Loviisa, Finland (1954–63); Kokkola, Finland (1963–68)
- Builder: Nylands Verksted
- Yard number: 340
- Launched: 1 September 1938
- Completed: 25 October 1938
- Out of service: 4 May 1968
- Identification: Code Letters DOUR (1934–49); Pennant Number TS(K)6 (1939–43); Pennant Number V 601 (1943–44); Schiff 12 (1939–44); Code Letters OUUC (1949–54); Denmark Official Number 13023 (1949–54); Code Letters OFUM (1954–68); Finland Official Number Lovisa 482 (1955–63); Finland Official Number Kokkola 71 (1963–68)
- Fate: Scrapped

General characteristics
- Class & type: Cargo ship (1930–39, 1945–68); Auxiliary cruiser / Vorpostenboot (1939–44)
- Tonnage: 1,421 GRT, 797 NRT, 2,500 DWT
- Length: 77.90 metres (255 ft 7 in)
- Beam: 12.52 metres (41 ft 1 in)
- Draught: 5.36 metres (17 ft 7 in)
- Depth: 4.45 metres (14 ft 7 in)
- Installed power: Compound steam engine, 54 nhp
- Propulsion: Screw propeller
- Speed: 12 knots (22 km/h)

Dr. Heinrich Wiegand was a cargo ship that was built in 1938 by Nysted Verksted, Oslo for the Argo Line, Bremen. She was requisitioned by the Kriegsmarine during World War II and was designated Schiff 12. She was sunk in September 1944 but was raised post-war and returned to service as Else Basse. She was sold to Finland in 1954 and renamed Kaarina. She was scrapped in 1968.

== Description ==
The ship was 77.90 metres (255 ft 7 in) long, with a beam of 12.52 metres (41 ft 1 in). She had a depth of 4.45 metres (14 ft 7 in), and a draught of 5.36 metres (17 ft 7 in). She was assessed at 1,421 GRT, 797 NRT, 2,500 DWT.

She was powered by a four-cylinder compound steam engine, which had two cylinders of 430 millimetres (16 3/4 in) diameter and two cylinders of 850 millimetres (33 1/2 in) diameter by 850 millimetres (33 1/2 in) stroke. The engine was built by Nylands Verkstged, Oslo. It was rated at 54 nhp and drove a screw propeller via a low-pressure turbine and a hydraulic coupling. It could propel her at 12 knots (22 km/h).

== History ==
Dr. Heinrich Wiegand was built as yard number 340 by Nylands Verksted, Oslo for Argo Line, Bremen. She was launched on 1 September 1939 and completed on 25 October. Her port of registry was Bremen and the Code Letters DOUR were allocated.

On 13 September 1938, Dr. Heinrich Wiegand was requisitioned by the Kriegsmarine. She was allocated the pennant number TS(K)2 and designated Schiff 12. Conversion for military use took from 29 November to 23 December. She was allocated to 6 Vorpostengruppe, and from 1943 to 6 Vorpostenflotille as V 601 Dr. Heinrich Wiegand. From 17 August 1940 to 17 September 1942, she was used as a transport ship in Norwegian waters. On 18 September 1944, she was sunk at Wesermünde during an Allied air attack.

Dr. Heinrich Wiegand was later refloated. On 20 July 1946, she was allocated to the United States as a prize of war. A notice appeared in The Times in August 1946 that her status as a prize was being decided in the British courts. She was allocated to the United States Maritime Commission. She retained the Code Letters DOUR. In 1948, she was sold to Seatrade Corp., New York City.

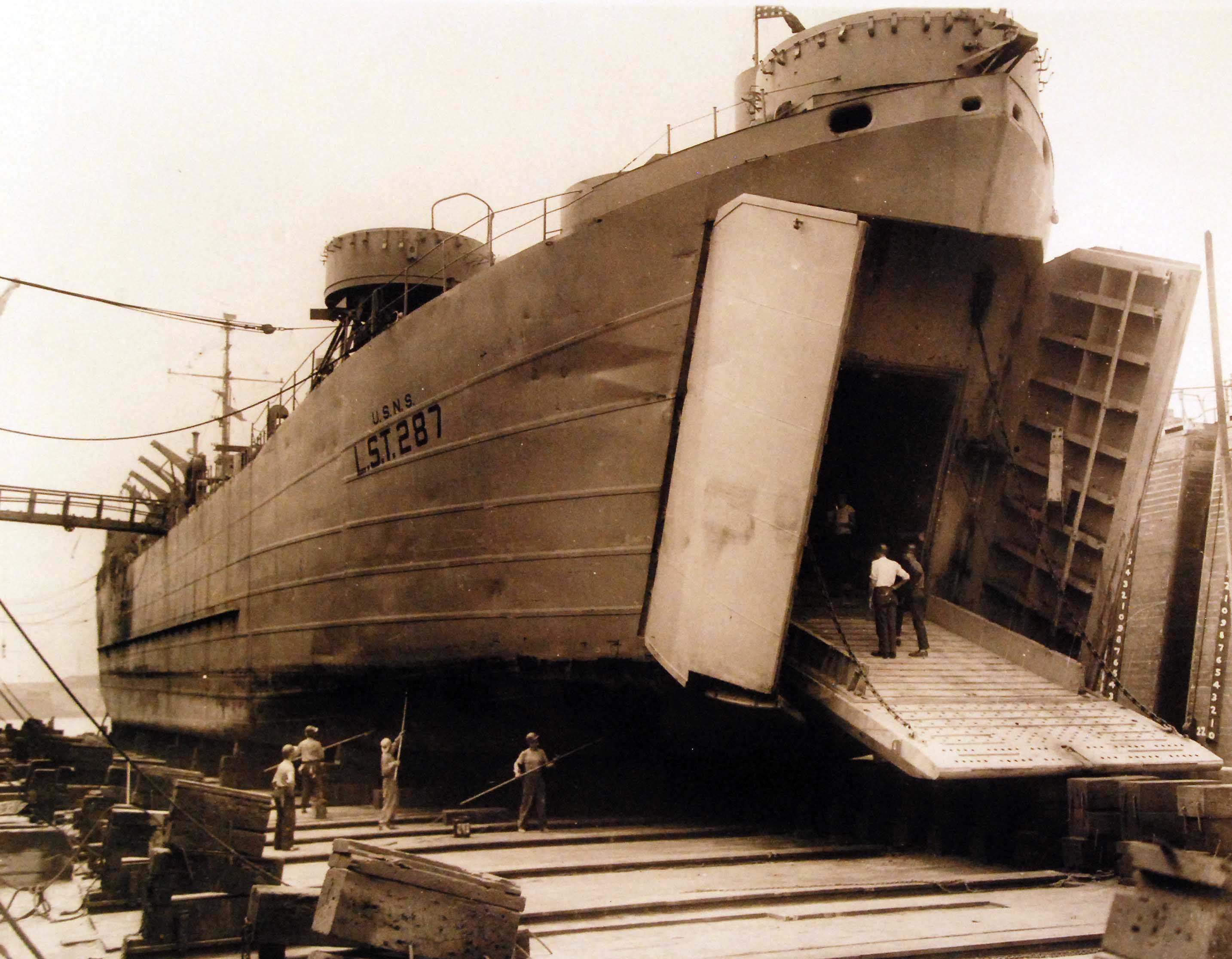
USNS LST-327, which assisted in extinguishing the fire aboard Else Basse in August 1953.

In November 1949, she was sold to AS Hetland, Copenhagen, Denmark and renamed Else Basse. The Code Letters OUUC and Danish Official Number 13023 were allocated. On 19 August 1953, while on a voyage from Greenland to Philadelphia, Pennsylvania, United States, she caught fire off Cape Anguille, Newfoundland, Canada. Her 24 crew and a passenger were rescued by the British steamship Corner Brook. The fire was extinguished by the United States Army tug LT-1953 and the United States Naval Service Landing Ship, Tank USNS LST-287. Else Basse was towed to St. George Bay by LT-1953 and LST-287. She was later towed to Philadelphia. She was subsequently towed to Copenhagen, arriving on 28 October. Else Basse was laid up.

On 1 April 1954, she was sold to Oy Suomi Shipping Ab, Loviisa, Finland and renamed Kaarina. She was rebuilt. The Code Letters OFUM were allocated. She was operated under the management of AB R. Nordström & Co., Oy until 1962. Kaarina was sold in 1963 to M. Rauanheimo Oy, Kokkola. Her port of registry was changed to Kokkola in 1964. She arrived at Hamburg, West Germany on 4 May 1968 for scrapping by Eckhardt & Co.
