= USS Romulus =

1944 LST-542-class tank landing ship

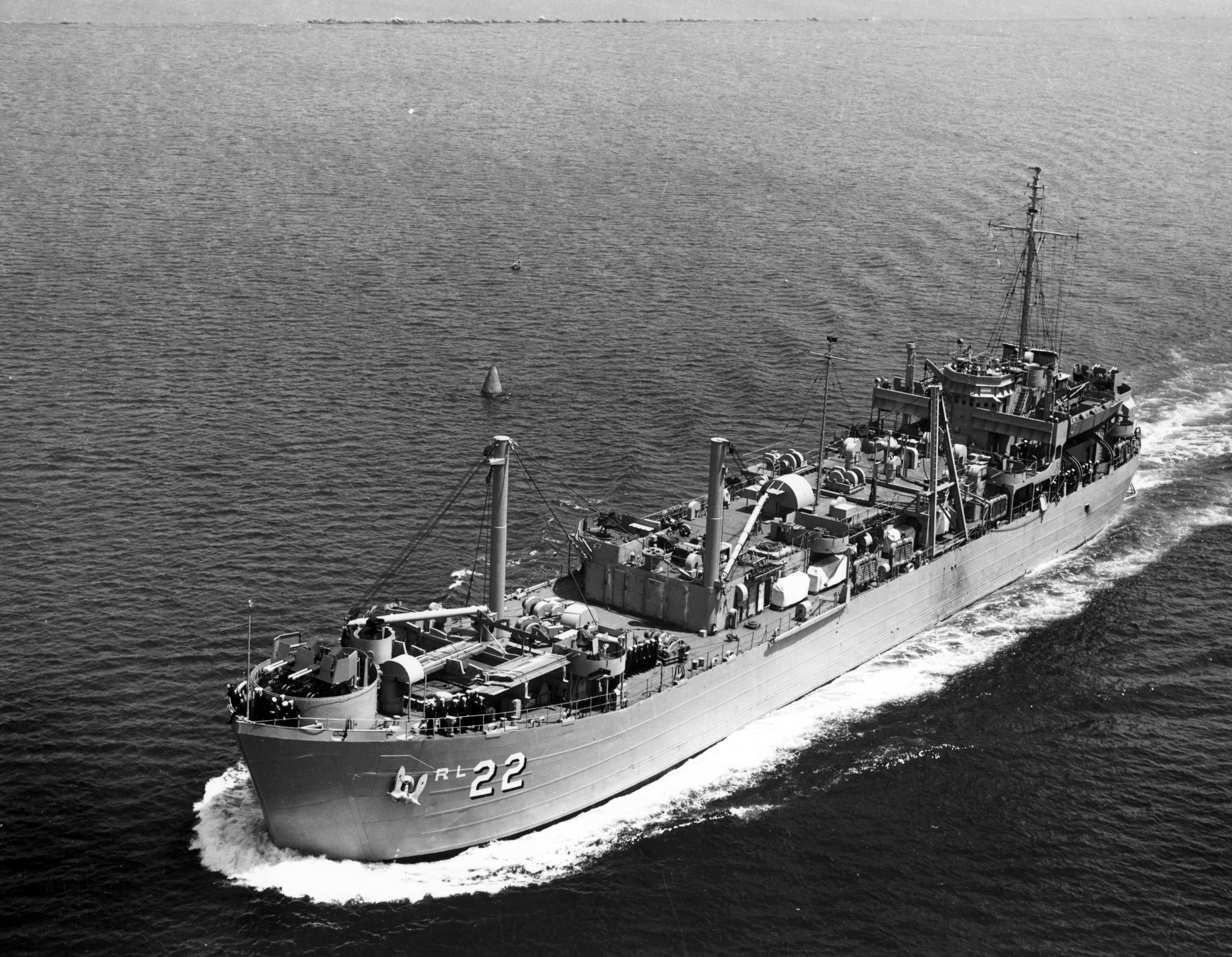
- USS Romulus in the 1950s

History

United States
- Name: LST-962; Romulus
- Namesake: Romulus
- Builder: Bethlehem-Hingham Shipyard, Hingham, Massachusetts
- Yard number: 3432
- Laid down: 17 October 1944
- Launched: 15 November 1944
- Commissioned: 9 December 1944, reduced commission; 10 May 1945, full commission
- Decommissioned: 8 January 1945; 12 May 1947
- Recommissioned: 2 April 1952
- Decommissioned: 1 June 1956
- Stricken: 1 October 1960
- Identification: Hull symbol: LST-962; Hull symbol: ARL-22; Code letters: NKFW
- Honors and awards: 1 × battle star (Korean War)
- Fate: Transferred to the Philippine Navy, November 1961

Philippines
- Name: Aklan (1961–1975); Kamagong (1975–1989)
- Namesake: Province of Aklan; Kamagong
- Acquired: November 1961
- Decommissioned: 1989
- Identification: Hull symbol: AR-67
- Status: fate unknown

General characteristics
- Class & type: LST-542-class tank landing ship; Achelous-class repair ship
- Displacement: 3,900 long tons (4,000 t) light; 4,100 long tons (4,200 t) full load
- Length: 328 ft (100 m) oa
- Beam: 50 ft (15 m)
- Draft: 11 ft 2 in (3.40 m)
- Installed power: 2 × 900 hp (670 kW) Electro-Motive Diesel 12-567A diesel engines; 1,800 shp (1,300 kW)
- Propulsion: 1 × Falk main reduction gears; 2 × Propellers
- Speed: 11.6 kn (21.5 km/h; 13.3 mph)
- Complement: 19 officers, 270 enlisted men
- Armament: 1 × 3 in (76 mm)/50 caliber dual purpose gun; 2 × quad 40 mm (1.57 in) Bofors guns (with Mark 51 directors); 2 × twin 40 mm Bofors guns (with Mark 51 directors); 6 × twin 20 mm (0.79 in) Oerlikon cannons

USS Romulus (ARL-22) was laid down as a United States Navy LST-542-class tank landing ship but converted to one of 39 Achelous-class repair ships that were used for repairing landing craft during World War II. Named for Romulus (along with Remus, one of the legendary twin sons of Mars and the Vestal Rhea Silvia), she was the only US Naval vessel to bear the name.

== Construction ==
LST-962 was laid down on 17 October 1944, at Hingham, Massachusetts, by the Bethlehem-Hingham Shipyard; launched 15 November 1944 at 11:30am; and commissioned 9 December 1944. On 10 December LST-962 shifted to the Boston Navy Yard, and on 11 December, departed for Jacksonville, Florida, where she entered the Gibbs Gas Engine Works yard for conversion to a landing craft repair ship (ARL). Decommissioned on 8 January 1945, she was recommissioned on 10 May, as Romulus (ARL-22).

== Service history ==
=== World War II ===
After shakedown, Romulus sailed for the Pacific. Transiting the Panama Canal in late June, she reached the Marianas in August, and for a short time tended and repaired landing craft at Apra Harbor, Guam, and Tanapag Harbor, Saipan. In early September, she continued west. From 25 September 1945 to 3 September 1946, she provided tender and repair services at the Yokosuka Naval Base, Honshū, Japan. Then ordered to Okinawa, she served in a similar capacity at Buckner Bay into December. Departing the Ryukyus early in the month, she visited Hong Kong, then continued on to the United States. Arriving at San Pedro, Los Angeles on 3 February 1947, she was decommissioned on 12 May, and berthed with the Pacific Reserve Fleet at San Diego.

=== Korean War ===
Recommissioned at San Diego, on 2 April 1952, Romulus remained on the west coast until January 1953. On 31 January, she sailed for the Far East, arriving at Yokosuka, on 6 March. Operations servicing amphibious ships then took the ARL to the ports of Nagoya, Sasebo, Buckner Bay, and Nagasaki. At the end of May, she shifted to Inchon, Korea, where she was assigned station ship and repair facility duty in support of UN forces in the area. Back in Japan from mid–June through July, she again served UN forces at Inchon from 2–26 August. She departed Yokosuka, on 6 September, and returned to San Diego, on 5 October. Romulus remained in the 1st Fleet until 3 January 1955, when she sailed once more for Yokosuka and Sasebo, Japan, and her last tender duty with the 7th Fleet. Returning to San Diego, on 27 April, Romulus briefly operated there, then prepared for inactivation.

In January 1956, she steamed to Astoria, Oregon. Six months later, on 1 June 1956, she was decommissioned and berthed with the Columbia River Group, Pacific Reserve Fleet. Struck from the Naval Vessel Register on 1 October 1960, she was transferred, under the terms of the Military Assistance Program, to the Republic of the Philippines in November 1961, and recommissioned as BRP Aklan (AR-67). Renamed Kamagong in 1975, the repair ship remained in the Philippine Navy until retired in 1989.

== Awards ==
Romulus earned one battle star during the Korean War.

== Bibliography ==
- "Romulus". Dictionary of American Naval Fighting Ships. Naval History and Heritage Command. 31 August 2015. This article incorporates text from this source, which is in the public domain.
- "Bethlehem-Hingham, Hingham MA". ShipbuildingHistory.com. 11 August 2011.
- "USS Romulus (ARL-22)". NavSource. 13 December 2013.
