= USS Orleans Parish =

1945 LST-542-class tank landing ship

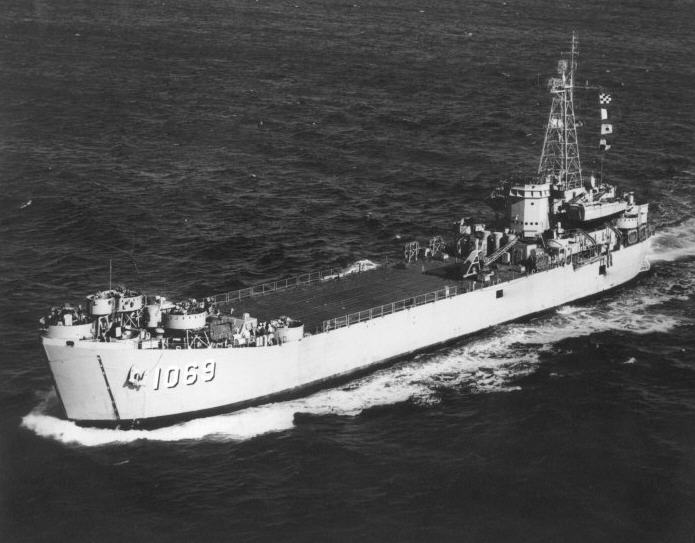
- USS Orleans Parish (LST-1069) underway, date and place unknown

History

United States
- Name: USS LST-1069
- Builder: Bethlehem-Hingham Shipyard, Hingham, Massachusetts
- Laid down: 7 February 1945
- Launched: 7 March 1945
- Acquired: 13 April 1945
- Commissioned: 31 March 1945
- Decommissioned: 6 August 1946
- Recommissioned: 11 January 1952
- Decommissioned: 20 May 1966
- In service: as USNS Orleans Parish (T-LST-1069), 20 May 1966
- Out of service: Date unknown
- Renamed: USS Orleans Parish (LST-1069), 1 July 1955
- Reclassified: MCS-6, 19 January 1959
- Stricken: 30 June 1975
- Fate: Sold to the Philippines, 1 September 1976

Philippines
- Name: BRP Cotabato Del Norte (LT-511)
- Acquired: 1 September 1976
- Fate: Unknown

General characteristics
- Class & type: LST-542-class tank landing ship
- Displacement: 1,625 long tons (1,651 t) light; 4,080 long tons (4,145 t) full
- Length: 328 ft (100 m)
- Beam: 50 ft (15 m)
- Draft: 5 ft 3 in (1.60 m)
- Propulsion: Two General Motors 12-567 diesel engines, two shafts, twin rudders
- Speed: 12 knots (22 km/h; 14 mph)
- Boats & landing craft carried: 2 or 6 × LCVPs
- Troops: 16 officers, 147 enlisted men
- Complement: 7 officers, 104 enlisted men
- Armament: 8 × 40 mm guns; 12 × 20 mm guns

USS Orleans Parish (LST-1069) was an LST-542-class tank landing ship in the United States Navy during World War II. Unlike many of her class, which received only numbers and were disposed of after World War II, she survived long enough to be named. On 1 July 1955, all LSTs still in commission were named for US counties or parishes; LST-1069 was given the name Orleans Parish, after Orleans Parish, Louisiana. She was the only U.S. Naval vessel to bear that name.

LST-1069 was laid down on 7 February 1945 at the Bethlehem-Hingham Shipyard of Hingham, Massachusetts; launched on 7 March 1945, sponsored by Mrs. James Whitfield; and commissioned on 31 March 1945.

== Service history ==
=== World War II, 1946–1946 ===
This new landing ship steamed to Chesapeake Bay for shakedown prior to her departure for the Pacific war zone. Before the end of June LCT sections, transported from New York to the Hawaiian Islands, had been off-loaded and Army troops destined for Leyte, Philippines embarked. Sailing via the Marshall and Mariana Islands, LST-1069 completed this mission and remained in the Philippines until after the Japanese surrender.

With LST Group 37 she proceeded to Shanghai thus becoming one of the first American ships to steam up the Yangtze River since the late 1930s. Here naval personnel were discharged in mid-September to set up an advanced operational base. In October and November Chinese troops were transferred to Formosa for occupation duty from Ningpoo, China and Haiphong, French Indochina respectively. Four round trips between Qingdao, China and Sasebo, Japan returned a number of Japanese civilians and soldiers to their home soil by 18 February 1946. After an additional voyage deposited a group of Korean repatriates at Pusan, Korea LST-1069 began to work her way toward the United States.

In the Bonin Islands 110 Marines along with some 18 Japanese war criminals and suspects awaited transportation to Guam. A round trip to Saipan followed and then on to Pearl Harbor, where LCI-757 was taken in tow and delivered on 29 May at San Francisco. Upon resuming her journey she transited the Panama Canal on 5 July, visited Norfolk, unloaded her ammunition in New Jersey and decommissioned at Staten Island, New York on 6 August 1946.

The ship remained in the 3rd Naval District serving the Naval Reserve Training Program until transferred to the Reserve Fleet, Green Cove Springs, Florida in September 1949.

=== Mine squadron flagship, 1952–1958 ===
The outbreak of Communist aggression in Korea ended her retirement two years later. Recommissioning on 11 January 1952 preceded conversion as a mine squadron flagship and logistic support vessel. Helicopter landing, fueling, and repair facilities also permitted her to embark and control helicopters as demonstrated during 1955 LANTMINEX. Also during 1955, on 1 July, LST–1069 was named USS Orleans Parish (LST-1069), and in December, she made her first Atlantic crossing to take part in an Atlantic Fleet mine evaluation project at Port Lyautey, French Morocco. Her duties as flagship for MinRon 8 were interrupted from 16 December 1957 to 19 December 1958, while the ship was out of commission in reserve at Charleston, South Carolina.

=== Mine countermeasures support ship, 1959–1966 ===
With additional communications equipment installed and other modifications she rejoined the fleet as the mine countermeasures support ship, USS Orleans Parish (MSC–6). Besides resuming participation in the annual Springboard, MinEx, and PhibEx exercises, on 20 November 1959 she departed Charleston escorting across the Atlantic several recently acquired Norwegian and Spanish minesweepers. After visiting Lisbon, Portugal she returned to her homeport on 4 January 1960. That summer she conducted her first ROTC Midshipmen indoctrination cruise. During February 1963 she paid her first visit to her namesake city at the height of the Mardi Gras festival.

=== Military Sea Transportation Service, 1966–1970 ===
Orleans Parish's area of operation and assignment changed greatly when she decommissioned on 20 May 1966, and was transferred to the Military Sea Transportation Service (MSTS). Again designated USS Orleans Parish (LST–1069) and altered to serve as a cargo ship, she soon received a civilian crew and 12 September sailed for the Panama Canal and the Pacific. Her first voyage brought her to Guam; Subic Bay, Philippines; Vũng Tàu, South Vietnam; and Yokohama, Japan. She continued to sail in 1970 under the MSTS Far Eastern Command.

=== Decommissioning and sale ===
Subsequently, placed out of service, she was struck from the Naval Vessel Register on 30 June 1975. The ship was sold to the Republic of the Philippines on 1 September 1976 to serve as BRP Cotabato Del Norte (LT-511).

== See also ==
- List of United States Navy LSTs
