= USS PCS-1376 =

Minesweeper of the United States Navy

History

United States
- Name: USS PCS-1376
- Builder: Wheeler Shipbuilding Corporation; Whitestone, New York
- Laid down: 13 October 1942
- Launched: 3 April 1943
- Sponsored by: Mrs. J. E. Flipse
- Commissioned: 9 July 1943
- Decommissioned: 28 February 1947
- In service: 28 February 1947 Naval Reserve training ship
- Out of service: 4 January 1950
- Renamed: Winder, 15 February 1956
- Namesake: Winder, Georgia
- Stricken: 5 September 1957
- Fate: Sold for scrapping, 15 April 1958

General characteristics
- Class & type: PCS-1376-class minesweeper
- Displacement: 245 (tl.)
- Length: 136 ft (41 m)
- Beam: 24 ft 6 in (7.47 m)
- Draft: 8 ft 7 in (2.62 m)
- Speed: 14.1 knots (26.1 km/h/16.2 mph)
- Complement: 57
- Armament: 1 × 3"/50 caliber dual purpose gun mount; 1 × 40 mm guns; 2 × 20 mm guns; 2 × depth charge projectors

USS PCS-1376 was the lead ship of her class of patrol minesweepers built for the United States Navy during World War II. Later in her career, she was named Winder after Winder, Georgia, becoming the only U.S. Navy ship of that name.

== History ==
PCS-1376 was laid down on 13 October 1942 at the Wheeler Shipbuilding Corporation in Whitestone, New York; launched on 3 April 1943, sponsored by Mrs. J. E. Flipse; and commissioned on 9 July 1943.

Following several days of trials, PCS-1376 departed Long Island for shakedown training in the vicinity of Cuba. At the conclusion of the cruise in August, she reported for duty as a school ship at the Submarine Chaser School located at Miami, Florida. The warship did double duty until the end of 1943 conducting anti-submarine patrols at night and training submarine chaser nucleus crews in the daytime. On New Year's Day 1944, she discontinued her nightly anti-submarine patrols and concentrated on preparing crews to man new submarine chasers. On 1 October 1944, she also gave up training duty but continued to support the schools mission by acting as an escort for larger ships conducting the actual at-sea training. That type of duty lasted until the cessation of hostilities of World War II in August 1945, at which time she resumed actual onboard training.

That assignment, however, endured for only two months. On 8 October 1945, she received orders to report for duty with the Atlantic Fleet Operational Training Command at Norfolk, Virginia. On 29 October, she began an extended availability, at the conclusion of which on 21 December the ship headed for Norfolk. By March 1946, the submarine chaser was homeported at Charleston, South Carolina, engaged in training naval reservists. However, by the beginning of 1947, she had moved back to Norfolk. On 28 February 1947, PCS-1376 was placed out of commission but remained active with the 5th Naval District Naval Reserve training program. On 10 June 1947, the ship was placed in service and continued her Naval Reserve training duties at Norfolk. On 4 January 1950, she was again placed out of service and was berthed at Norfolk. In May 1950, she was reassigned from the Norfolk Group, Atlantic Reserve Fleet, to the Green Cove Springs, Florida, Group. There, she remained until the middle of 1957.

On 15 February 1956, she received the name Winder. However, she carried that name only 19 months, because the ship was struck from the Naval Vessel Register on 5 September 1957. She was sold for scrapping on 15 April 1958 to Mr. Fred Irvine of Miami, Florida.

== See also ==
- List of patrol vessels of the United States Navy
