= HMS Emphatic =

Favourite-class tugboat of the Royal Navy

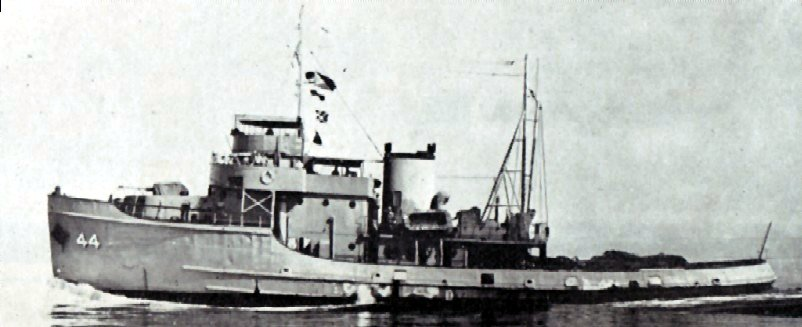
- BRP Ifugao underway around 1953

History

United Kingdom
- Name: HMS Emphatic
- Builder: Levingston Shipbuilding Company, Orange, Texas
- Launched: 18 August 1943
- Commissioned: 27 January 1944
- Stricken: 8 May 1946
- Identification: W154
- Fate: Returned to the United States Navy, 1946

General characteristics
- Type: Favourite-class tugboat
- Displacement: 835 tons full
- Length: 143 ft (44 m)
- Beam: 33 ft 10 in (10.31 m) (extreme)
- Draught: 13 ft 2 in (4.01 m) (limiting)
- Propulsion: one General Motors Diesel-electric model 12-278A single Fairbanks Morse Main Reduction Gear Ship's Service Generators one Diesel-drive 60 kW 120 V D.C. one Diesel-drive 30 kW 120 V D.C. single propeller, 1,500 shp (1,100 kW)
- Speed: 13 knots (24 km/h; 15 mph)
- Complement: 45
- Armament: 1 x 3-inch/50-caliber gun

HMS Emphatic (W 154) was a Favourite-class tugboat of the Royal Navy during World War II. Emphatic was built in the United States and transferred to the Royal Navy under Lend-Lease. She participated in the Normandy landings and was returned to the United States Navy postwar. She was transferred to the Philippine Navy in 1948 and received the name Ifugao. She was stricken form the naval register in 1979.

== Service history ==
Emphatic was laid down in 1943 by the Levingston Shipbuilding Company in Orange, Texas, as ATR-96, launched 18 August 1943 and commissioned into the Royal Navy under Lend-Lease on 27 January 1944 as HMS Emphatic (W 154). She served through the war with the Royal Navy. During the Normandy landings, she towed Mulberry harbour pontoons.

The ship was returned to the United States Navy in 1946. She was transferred to the Philippine Navy in July 1948 and renamed BRP Ifugao (AQ-44). The tug was stricken form the naval register in 1979 her fate after that is unknown.
