= USS Project =

Minesweeper of the United States Navy

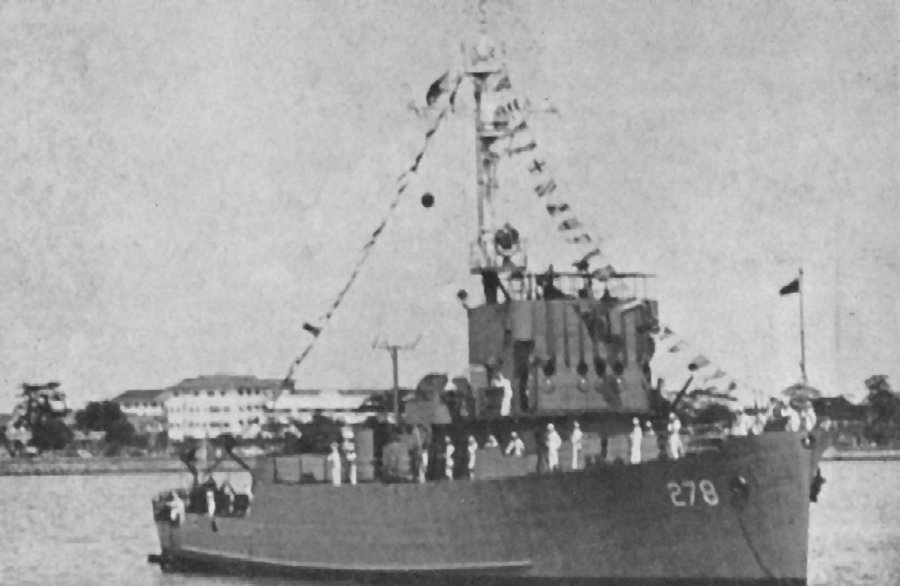

History

United States
- Name: USS Project
- Builder: Gulf Shipbuilding Company
- Laid down: 1 July 1943
- Launched: 20 November 1943
- Sponsored by: Mrs. Irene D. Jenkins
- Commissioned: 22 August 1944
- Decommissioned: 13 June 1946
- Stricken: 16 September 1947
- Fate: Transferred to the Philippines, 24 May 1948

History

Philippines
- Name: RPS Samar (M-33)
- Acquired: 24 May 1948
- Reclassified: PS-33
- Stricken: 1960
- Fate: unknown, likely scrapped

General characteristics
- Class & type: Admirable-class minesweeper
- Displacement: 650 tons; 945 tons (full load)
- Length: 184 ft 6 in (56.24 m)
- Beam: 33 ft (10 m)
- Draft: 9 ft 9 in (2.97 m)
- Propulsion: 2 × 1,710 shp (1,280 kW) Cooper Bessemer GSB-8 diesel engines; National Supply Co. single reduction gear; 2 shafts
- Speed: 14.8 knots (27.4 km/h)
- Complement: 104
- Armament: 1 × 3"/50 caliber gun DP; 1 × twin Bofors 40 mm guns; 6 × Oerlikon 20 mm cannon; 1 × Hedgehog anti-submarine mortar; 4 × Depth charge projectors (K-guns); 2 × Depth charge racks

Service record
- Part of: US Atlantic Fleet (1944-1945); US Pacific Fleet (1945-1946)
- Awards: 2 Battle stars

USS Project (AM–278) was an Admirable-class minesweeper built for the United States Navy during World War II. She was decommissioned in 1947 after wartime service and transferred to the Philippine Navy in 1948 where she served under the name RPS Samar (M-33). She was stricken from the Philippine Navy in 1960; beyond that, her fate is not reported in secondary sources.

== Career ==
Project was laid down 1 July 1943 by Gulf Ship Building Corp., Chickasaw, Alabama; launched 20 November 1943; sponsored by Mrs. Irene D. Jenkins; and commissioned 22 August 1944. Project departed U.S. Naval Repair Station, Algiers, Louisiana, 7 September for Little Creek, Virginia. En route, she drove off German submarine U-518 after it had torpedoed SS George Ade 125 nautical miles (232 km; 144 mi) off Wilmington, North Carolina, 12 September. Later operations for the minesweeper ranged from Portland, Maine, where she trained with friendly submarines in October, to Cape Charles, Virginia, where she planted small mines, to Port Royal, Bermuda, to which she escorted Keawah and Sapelo in December.

Project continued Atlantic Ocean coast operations during the first half of 1945 but in July proceeded via the Panama Canal Zone to San Pedro, California. Engaging in minesweeping operations off California in August, the ship steamed to Pearl Harbor the 24th and on to Eniwetok and Saipan in September. After stopping at Buckner Bay, she reached Japan on the 20th. She remained in Japanese waters in connection with Japanese minesweeping activity and to make exploratory sweeps in the Omai Saki area.

Project was decommissioned, 13 June 1946 at Subic Bay, Philippines, and struck from the Naval Vessel Register on 16 September 1947. She was transferred to the Philippines on 24 May 1948 as RPS Samar (M-33). She was later reclassified as a patrol corvette with pennant number of PS-33. She was stricken in 1960. After Decommissioning from the Philippine Navy, she was transferred to the Bureau of Coast and Geodetic Survey (BCGS) in 1960.She was renamed RPS RESEARCH and served with BCGS until 1975 and eventually returned to the Philippine Navy and Probably Scrapped. Source: NAMRIA INFOMAPPER July 2001 issue and CDR Mark R Condeno

== Awards ==
Project received one battle star for U.S. World War II service.
