= USS LST-1072 =

1945 LST Mk. 2-class tank-landing ship

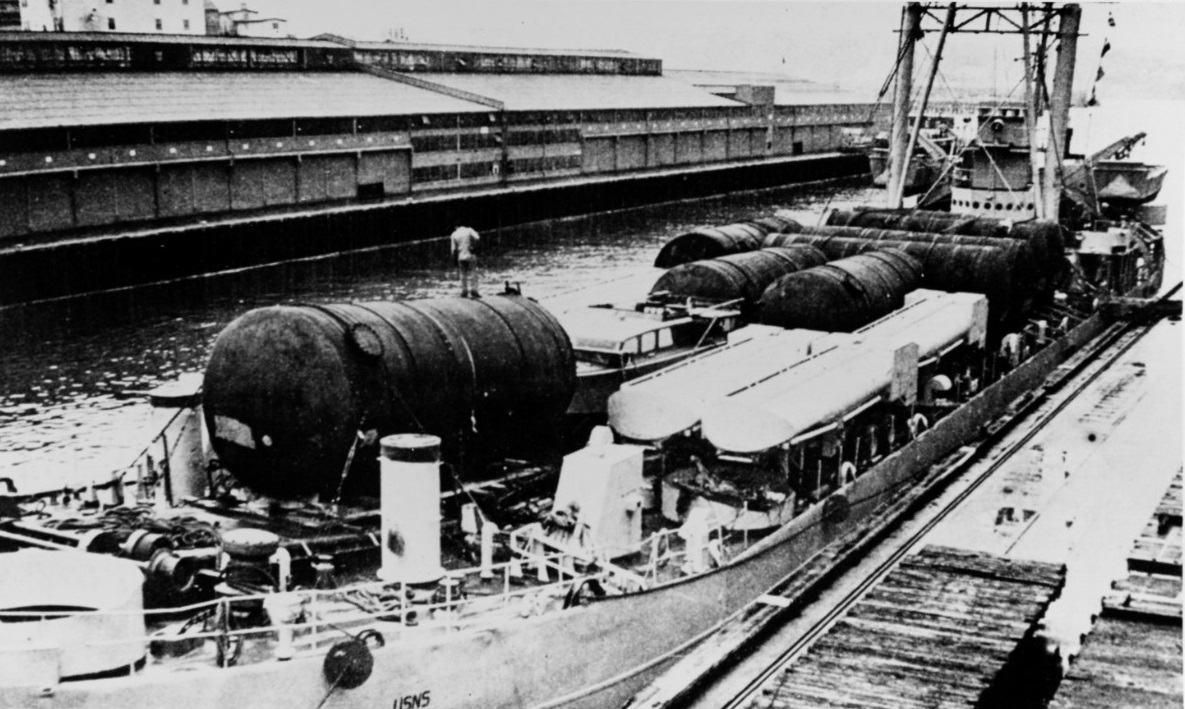
- USNS LST-1072 photographed circa 1950s.

History

United States
- Name: LST-1072
- Builder: Bethlehem-Hingham Shipyard, Hingham, Massachusetts
- Yard number: 3462
- Laid down: 16 February 1945
- Launched: 20 March 1945
- Sponsored by: Mrs. Florence Mitchell
- Commissioned: 12 April 1945
- Decommissioned: 24 May 1946
- Stricken: 23 June 1947
- Identification: Hull symbol: LST-1072; Code letters: NAIR
- Fate: Transferred to the Military Sea Transportation Service (MSTS), 2 April 1951

United States
- Name: T-LST-1072
- Acquired: 2 April 1951
- Stricken: 20 June 1975
- Identification: Hull symbol: T-LST-1066
- Fate: Transferred to the Philippine Navy, 13 September 1976

Republic of the Philippines
- Name: Tawi Tawi
- Namesake: The Province of Tawi Tawi
- Acquired: 13 September 1976
- Identification: Hull symbol: LT-512
- Fate: Scrapped, date unknown

General characteristics
- Class & type: LST-542-class tank landing ship
- Displacement: 1,625 long tons (1,651 t) (light); 4,080 long tons (4,145 t) (full (seagoing draft with 1,675 short tons (1,520 t) load); 2,366 long tons (2,404 t) (beaching)
- Length: 328 ft (100 m) oa
- Beam: 50 ft (15 m)
- Draft: Unloaded: 2 ft 4 in (0.71 m) forward; 7 ft 6 in (2.29 m) aft; Full load: 8 ft 3 in (2.51 m) forward; 14 ft 1 in (4.29 m) aft; Landing with 500 short tons (450 t) load: 3 ft 11 in (1.19 m) forward; 9 ft 10 in (3.00 m) aft; Limiting 11 ft 2 in (3.40 m); Maximum navigation 14 ft 1 in (4.29 m)
- Installed power: 2 × 900 hp (670 kW) Electro-Motive Diesel 12-567A diesel engines; 1,800 shp (1,300 kW)
- Propulsion: 1 × Falk main reduction gears; 2 × Propellers
- Speed: 11.6 kn (21.5 km/h; 13.3 mph)
- Range: 24,000 nmi (44,000 km; 28,000 mi) at 9 kn (17 km/h; 10 mph) while displacing 3,960 long tons (4,024 t)
- Boats & landing craft carried: 2 x LCVPs
- Capacity: 1,600–1,900 short tons (3,200,000–3,800,000 lb; 1,500,000–1,700,000 kg) cargo depending on mission
- Troops: 16 officers, 147 enlisted men
- Complement: 13 officers, 104 enlisted men
- Armament: Varied, ultimate armament; 2 × twin 40 mm (1.57 in) Bofors guns; 4 × single 40 mm Bofors guns; 12 × 20 mm (0.79 in) Oerlikon cannons

Service record
- Part of: LST Flotilla 34
- Awards: American Campaign Medal; Asiatic–Pacific Campaign Medal; World War II Victory Medal; Navy Occupation Service Medal w/Asia Clasp; National Defense Service Medal

USS LST-1072 was an LST-542-class tank landing ship in the United States Navy. Like many of her class, she was not named and is properly referred to by her hull designation.

== Construction ==
LST-1072 was laid down on 16 February 1945, at Hingham, Massachusetts, by the Bethlehem-Hingham Shipyard; launched on 20 March 1945; sponsored by Mrs. Florence Mitchell; and commissioned on 16 March 1945.

== Service history ==
Following World War II, LST-1072 performed occupation duty in the Far East until early December 1945. She was transferred to the Military Sea Transportation Service (MSTS) on 2 April 1951, where she operated as USNS T-LST-1072. The ship was transferred to the Philippines, under the Security Assistance Program, on 13 September 1976. She was renamed Tawi Tawi (LT-512) and commissioned into the Philippine Navy. She was scrapped at an unknown date.

== Bibliography ==
Online resources

- "LST-1072". Dictionary of American Naval Fighting Ships. Naval History and Heritage Command. This article incorporates text from this source, which is in the public domain.
- "Bethlehem-Hingham, Hingham MA". www.ShipbuildingHistory.com. 11 August 2011.
- "USS LST-1072". NavSource. 23 September 2016.
