= USS LST-222 =

LST-1-class landing ship tank

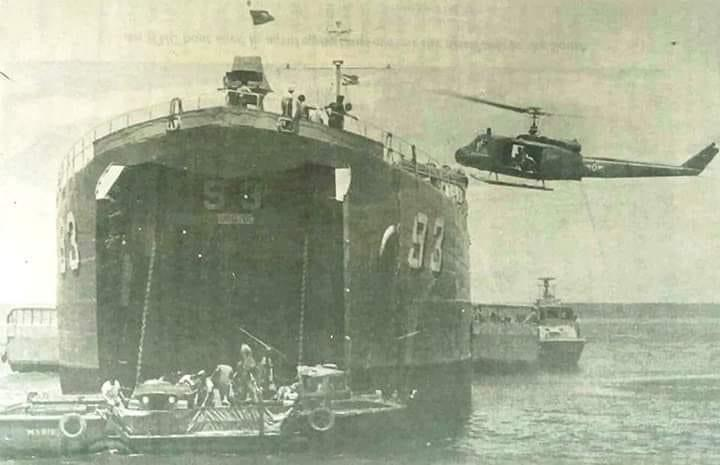
- RPS Mindoro Occidental (LT-93)

History

United States
- Name: LST-222
- Builder: Chicago Bridge and Iron Co., Seneca
- Laid down: 16 March 1943
- Launched: 17 August 1943
- Sponsored by: Mrs. Ruth Clydedale
- Commissioned: 10 September 1943
- Decommissioned: February 1946
- Reclassified: LST(H)-222, 15 September 1945; Q044, February 1946; T-LST-222, 31 March 1952
- Stricken: 15 July 1972
- Identification: Callsign: NPMS
- Honors and awards: See Awards
- Fate: Transferred to Philippines, 15 July 1972

Philippines
- Name: Mindoro Occidental
- Namesake: Mindoro Occidental
- Acquired: 15 July 1972
- Commissioned: 15 July 1972
- Identification: Hull number: LT-93
- Fate: Scrapped

General characteristics
- Class & type: LST-1-class tank landing ship
- Displacement: 4,080 long tons (4,145 t) full load; 2,160 long tons (2,190 t) landing
- Length: 328 ft (100 m) oa
- Beam: 50 ft (15 m)
- Draft: Full load: 8 ft 2 in (2.49 m) forward; 14 ft 1 in (4.29 m) aft; Landing at 2,160 t: 3 ft 11 in (1.19 m) forward; 9 ft 10 in (3.00 m) aft
- Installed power: 2 × 900 hp (670 kW) Electro-Motive Diesel 12-567A diesel engines; 1,700 shp (1,300 kW)
- Propulsion: 1 × Falk main reduction gears; 2 × Propellers
- Speed: 12 kn (22 km/h; 14 mph)
- Range: 24,000 nmi (44,000 km; 28,000 mi) at 9 kn (17 km/h; 10 mph) while displacing 3,960 long tons (4,024 t)
- Boats & landing craft carried: 2 or 6 x LCVPs
- Capacity: 2,100 tons oceangoing maximum; 350 tons main deckload
- Troops: 16 officers, 147 enlisted men
- Complement: 13 officers, 104 enlisted men
- Armament: Varied, ultimate armament; 2 × twin 40 mm (1.57 in) Bofors guns; 4 × single 40 mm Bofors guns; 12 × 20 mm (0.79 in) Oerlikon cannons

USS LST-222 was a LST-1-class tank landing ship in the United States Navy during World War II. She was transferred to the Philippine Navy as RPS Mindoro Occidental (LT-93).

== Construction and career ==
LST-222 was laid down on 16 March 1943 at Chicago Bridge and Iron Co., Seneca, Illinois. Launched on 17 August 1943 and commissioned on 10 September 1943.

=== Service in the United States Navy ===
During World War II, LST-222 was assigned to the Asiatic-Pacific theater. She then participated in the Invasion of Normandy from 6 to 25 June 1944.

She participated in the occupation of Kwajalein and Majuro Atolls from 31 January to 8 February 1944 and also the occupation of Saipan from 15 to 24 June 1944. Tinian capture and occupation from 24 to 28 July 1944. Capture and occupation of southern Palau Islands, 6 September 14 October 1944

On 15 September 1945, she was converted into a Landing Ship, Tank (Hospital) and was reclassified LST(H)-222.

She assigned to Occupation service in the Far East from 17 October 1945 to 5 February 1946.

She was decommissioned in February 1946 and came under the Commander Naval Forces Far East (COMNAVFE) Shipping Control Authority for Japan (SCAJAP), redesignated Q044.

Transferred to the Military Sea Transportation Service (MSTS), 31 March 1952, and placed in service as USNS T-LST-222.

LST-222 was struck from the Navy Register on 15 July 1972 and transferred to the Philippines.

=== Service in the Philippine Navy ===
She was acquired by the Philippine Navy on 15 July 1972 and renamed RPS Mindoro Occidental (LT-93).

On 19 April 1974, a 20-day marathon on bicycles named Tour of Luzon-Visayas with 200 participants boarded the ship at South Harbor in order to continue the marathon in Tolosa.

On 11 January 1981, BRP Mindoro Occidental carried relief goods to Samar after a tropical storm had hit the area.

She was possibly sold as scrap in the early 1990s.

== Awards ==
LST-222 have earned the following awards:

- American Campaign Medal
- Asiatic-Pacific Campaign Medal (4 battle stars)
- Navy Occupation Medal (with Asia clasp)
- World War II Victory Medal

== Sources ==
- United States. Dept. of the Treasury (1962). Treasury Decisions Under the Customs, Internal Revenue, Industrial Alcohol, Narcotic and Other Laws, Volume 97. U.S. Government Printing Office.
- Moore, Capt. John (1984). Jane's Fighting Ships 1984-85. Jane's Information Group. ISBN 978-0710607959.
- Saunders, Stephen (2009). Jane's Fighting Ships 2009-2010. Jane's Information Group. ISBN 978-0710628886.
- Fairplay International Shipping Journal Volume 222. United Kingdom: Fairplay Publishing Limited. 1967.
