= USS Madera County =

American tank landing ship

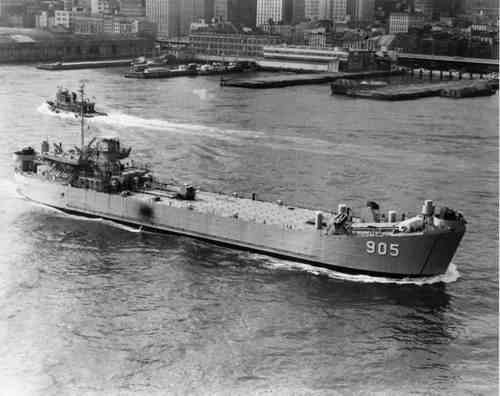
- USS Madera County (LST-905), on the Hudson River in New York Harbor, date unknown

History

United States
- Name: USS LST-905
- Builder: Dravo Corporation, Pittsburgh
- Laid down: 19 November 1944
- Launched: 30 November 1944
- Commissioned: 20 January 1945
- Decommissioned: 11 September 1946
- Renamed: USS Madera County (LST-905), 1 July 1955
- Recommissioned: 30 March 1963
- Decommissioned: 1969
- Stricken: 15 September 1979
- Honors and awards: 1 battle star (World War II); 10 campaign stars (Vietnam)
- Fate: Leased to the Philippines, 29 November 1969; Sold outright, 1 March 1980

Philippines
- Name: RPS Ilocos Norte (LT-87)
- Acquired: 29 November 1969
- Stricken: 1992
- Fate: Unknown

General characteristics
- Class & type: LST-542-class tank landing ship
- Displacement: 1,625 long tons (1,651 t) light; 4,080 long tons (4,145 t) full
- Length: 328 ft (100 m)
- Beam: 50 ft (15 m)
- Draft: Unloaded : 2 ft 4 in (0.71 m) forward; 7 ft 6 in (2.29 m) aft; Loaded : 8 ft 2 in (2.49 m) forward; 14 ft 1 in (4.29 m) aft
- Propulsion: 2 × General Motors 12-567 diesel engines, two shafts, twin rudders
- Speed: 12 knots (22 km/h; 14 mph)
- Boats & landing craft carried: 2 × LCVPs
- Troops: Approximately 130 officers and enlisted men
- Complement: 8–10 officers, 89–100 enlisted men
- Armament: 4 × 40 mm guns; 12 × 20 mm guns; 4 x 50 caliber machine guns

USS Madera County (LST-905) was a LST-542-class tank landing ship built for the United States Navy during World War II. Named after Madera County, California, she was the only U.S. Naval vessel to bear the name.

Originally laid down as LST-905 by the Dravo Corporation of Pittsburgh, Pennsylvania on 19 November 1944; launched on 30 November 1944, sponsored by Mrs. Paul Gulling; and commissioned on 20 January 1945.

== Service history ==
=== World War II, 1945–1946 ===
After commissioning, the ship was fitted out at New Orleans and then underwent brief training exercises along the gulf coast. In February 1945 she departed for the Pacific, arriving the next month at Pearl Harbor. Following further training, she departed Hawaii on 16 April for the Marianas. By mid-May she was at Guam where she joined a convoy then gathering to get underway for Okinawa. She arrived at Okinawa Gunto on 8 June, remaining until the 28th. She continued to operate in the western Pacific, shuttling cargo and passengers among the island groups until returning to the United States in 1946. On 11 September 1946 she was deactivated and assigned to the Pacific Reserve Fleet.

While still inactive the LST was given the name USS Madera County (LST-905) on 1 July 1955.

=== 1963–1965 ===
On 30 March 1963 Madera County recommissioned, retaining her reserve status. With a crew of volunteers from the Pacific Fleet's Amphibious Force, she underwent shakedown training at San Diego and then began preparations for a voyage to a new home port at the Naval Amphibious Base, Little Creek, Virginia. Arriving there on 19 June, she came under the control of the Commander, Atlantic Reserve Fleet. Her mission as part of this Fleet was to be able to support, on short notice, any military operation in the Atlantic-Caribbean area. The next year and a half was spent on extensive amphibious training exercises and shipyard periods to insure this ability.

On 22 March 1965 she proceeded to Florida's Cape Kennedy to stand by during the recovery phase of the first manned Project Gemini shot. On 27 April the ship again departed Little Creek for southern waters, this time transporting equipment to Puerto Rico. The next day the Dominican Republic crisis arose, and upon delivery of her cargo at Roosevelt Roads, Puerto Rico she headed for San Juan where she went on four-hour standby duty. In May she made one trip to Little Creek, returning to the Caribbean within two weeks with Army units aboard. On 8 June, she debarked these units at Puerta de Andres, Dominican Republic and loaded other Army units for a voyage back to the east coast. She returned to Little Creek on 15 June, but before the end of the year completed three more Caribbean deployments; 13 August to 15 September 25 October to 10 November, and 18 November to 8 December. On 11 December the LST was assigned active status and then underwent overhaul in preparation for extended sea duty.

=== Vietnam War, 1966–1969 ===
Ordered to the western Pacific, Madera County steamed out of Hampton Roads on 11 February 1966 en route to the Philippines. She entered Subic Bay on 1 May and the next week commenced logistic support of Vietnamese operations. During the ensuing months she transported ammunition and construction materials to the Republic of Vietnam, off-loading at ports such as Qui Nhon, Da Nang, Chu Lai, and Nha Trang. She also called at ports in the Philippines, on Taiwan and in Japan. Upkeep and maintenance periods were held at Sasebo during July and December 1966. Following her December overhaul, Madera County returned to Subic Bay and support of combat operations in South Vietnam, continuing this role through 1969.

Madera County was attached to Landing Ship Squadron 2 (LANSHIPRON 2) and classified as an "in-country" activity, her crew made up of sailors who volunteered for service in Vietnam. She operated under orders from Naval Support Activity, Vietnam (NAVSUPPACT), and the Military Sea Transport Service (MSTS). During 1967–1969 she operated primarily in the Mekong Delta providing personnel/equipment transport and logistical support to the Patrol Boat, River (PBR) Base at Binh Thuy and Mobile Riverine Force (MRF) bases up and down the river.

In 1967–68 a typical run started from Saigon (Newport LST piers) then to Vũng Tàu and across Vũng Tàu Bay to the mouth of the Mekong River near Mỹ Tho. From the Mỹ Tho area the trip continued up river to a turn through point near Vĩnh Long into the Bassac River. The run continued down the Bassac to the PBR base LST ramp at Binh Thuy. After off-loading cargo the ship proceeded on the Bassac River to the Vũng Tàu anchorage and then back to Saigon for another load.

During the same period the ship made several trips up the coast of South Vietnam, beaching at Nha Trang and Da Nang. From Da Nang the ship loaded with trucks and transported Marines and supplies to Cửa Việt Base near the Vietnamese Demilitarized Zone.

During the Tet Offensive Madera County was ordered to proceed into Saigon on 2 February 1968 to see if the port was still viable for merchant ships that were backing up at the Vung Tau anchorage. The ship arrived after going through the "abandoned" heart of Saigon and had to anchor at the Newport Beach LST slip because Army personnel were not present to assist with docking. The ship's LCVPs were lowered, a line handling party put on the pier and the ship was docked by her own crew. That afternoon a party of officers went into Saigon and returned about dusk with a USO tour of NFL players who were stranded at the Capitol Hotel. The players included (among others): Jack Kemp, Bobby Bell, Andy Russell, Bill Brown and John David Crow. A most unusual day.

In June 1968 Madera County began logistical support operations with the Mobile Riverine Force. That assignment continued until she was turned over to the Philippine Navy in 1969.

The motto of Madera County was: "Any Beach in the World" and included a few places that weren't beaches at all!

=== Decommissioning and transfer ===
Decommissioned (date unknown), the tank landing ship was transferred (leased) to the Philippine Navy on 29 November 1969 and renamed RPS Ilcos Norte (LT-87). Struck from the Naval Vessel Register on 15 September 1979, she was sold to the Philippines on 1 March 1980. The ship was struck from the Philippine Navy in 1992; her final fate is unknown.

== Awards ==
LST-905 earned one battle star for World War II service, and as Madera County ten campaign stars for Vietnam War service.
