= USS LST-843 =

1944 LST-542-class tank landing ship

History

United States
- Name: USS LST-843
- Builder: American Bridge Company
- Laid down: 13 October 1944
- Launched: 29 November 1944
- Commissioned: 23 December 1944
- Decommissioned: 18 December 1947
- Stricken: 22 January 1948
- Honours and awards: 1 battle star (World War II)
- Fate: Transferred to the Philippines

General characteristics
- Class & type: LST-542-class tank landing ship
- Displacement: 1,490 long tons (1,514 t) light; 4,080 long tons (4,145 t) full
- Length: 328 ft (100 m)
- Beam: 50 ft (15 m)
- Draft: Unloaded : 2 ft 4 in (0.71 m) forward; 7 ft 6 in (2.29 m) aft; Loaded : 8 ft 2 in (2.49 m) forward; 14 ft 1 in (4.29 m) aft
- Propulsion: 2 × General Motors 12-567 diesel engines, two shafts, twin rudders
- Speed: 12 knots (22 km/h; 14 mph)
- Boats & landing craft carried: 2 LCVPs
- Troops: 16 officers, 147 enlisted men
- Complement: 7 officers, 104 enlisted men
- Armament: 8 × 40 mm guns; 12 × 20 mm guns

USS LST-843 was an LST-542-class tank landing ship built for the United States Navy during World War II.

LST-843 was laid down on 13 October 1944 at Ambridge, Pennsylvania, by the American Bridge Company; launched on 29 November 1944; sponsored by R. S. Dyson; and commissioned on 23 December 1944.

== Service history ==
During World War II, LST-843 was assigned to the Asiatic-Pacific theater and participated in the assault and occupation of Okinawa Gunto from April through June 1945. Following the War, the ship performed occupation duty in the Far East and saw service in China until early December 1947. She was decommissioned on 18 December 1947, transferred to the Philippines and renamed BPR Bulacan. On 22 January 1948 the tank landing ship was struck from the Naval Vessel Register.

LST-843 earned one battle star for World War II service.
