= USS LST-842 =

1944 LST-542-class tank landing ship

History

United States
- Name: USS LST-828
- Builder: American Bridge Company, Ambridge, Pennsylvania
- Laid down: 9 October 1944
- Launched: 24 November 1944
- Commissioned: 19 December 1944
- Decommissioned: 30 December 1947
- Stricken: 22 January 1948
- Honours and awards: 1 battle star (World War II)
- Fate: Transferred to the Philippines

General characteristics
- Class & type: LST-542-class tank landing ship
- Displacement: 1,490 long tons (1,514 t) light; 4,080 long tons (4,145 t) full
- Length: 328 ft (100 m)
- Beam: 50 ft (15 m)
- Draft: 8 ft (2.4 m) forward; 14 ft 4 in (4.37 m) aft
- Propulsion: 2 × General Motors 12-567 diesel engines, two shafts
- Speed: 10.8 knots (20.0 km/h; 12.4 mph)
- Complement: 7 officers, 104 enlisted men
- Armament: 6 × 40 mm guns; 6 × 20 mm guns

USS LST-842 was an LST-542-class tank landing ship in the United States Navy. Like many of her class, she was not named and is properly referred to by her hull designation.

LST-842 was laid down on 9 October 1944 at Ambridge, Pennsylvania, by the American Bridge Company; launched on 24 November 1944; sponsored by Mrs. F. T. Hulet; and commissioned on 19 December 1944.

== Service history ==
During World War II, LST-842 was assigned to the Asiatic-Pacific theater and participated in the assault and occupation of Okinawa Gunto in June 1945. Following the war, the ship performed occupation duty in the Far East until mid-September 1945. She was decommissioned on 30 December 1947, and transferred to the Philippine government to serve as BRP Pampanga. On 22 January 1948, the tank landing ship was struck from the Navy list.

LST-842 earned one battle star for World War II service.
