= Giovanni Bacordo =

Filipino Admiral

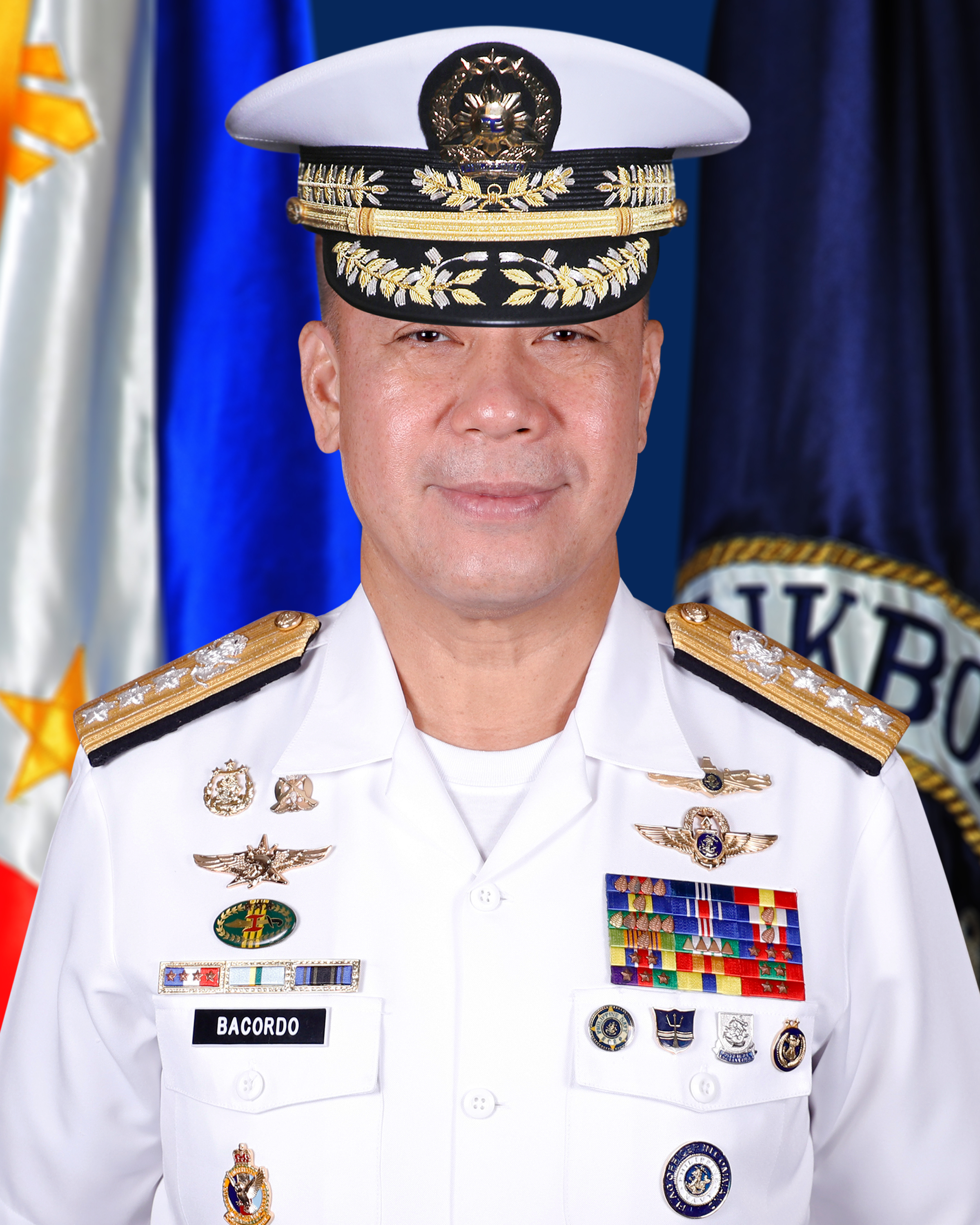

38th Chief of the Philippine Navy
- In office 3 February 2020 – 8 June 2021
- President: Rodrigo Duterte
- Preceded by: V. Adm. Robert Empedrad
- Succeeded by: V. Adm. Adeluis Bordado

Personal details
- Born: Giovanni Carlo Jamero Bacordo La Paz, Iloilo City, Philippines
- Education: Philippine Military Academy; De La Salle University, (M.Econ); Australian Defence College, (M.DS)
- Nickname: "Joby"

Military service
- Allegiance: Philippines
- Branch/service: Philippine Navy
- Years of service: 1987–2021
- Rank: Vice Admiral
- Unit: Chief of the Philippine Navy; Philippine Fleet; Naval Sea Systems Command; Naval Forces Southern Luzon, SOLCOM; Joint Task Force Kingfisher, SOLCOM; Naval Task Force ZAMBASULTA, WESMINCOM; Naval Task Force 61, WESTMINCOM; Naval Task Force 41, WESCOM; BRP Rajah Humabon (PS-11); BRP Miguel Malvar (PS-19); BRP Rafael Pargas (PC-379); BRP Juan Magluyan (PC-392)
- Battles/wars: Moro conflict Communist rebellion in the Philippines; 2013 Lahad Datu standoff

Vice Admiral Giovanni Carlo Jamero Bacordo is a Filipino admiral who was the Chief of the Philippine Navy. He is a graduate of the Philippine Military Academy "Hinirang" Class of 1987. Prior to his post, he served as the commander of the Philippine Fleet.

In September 2022, he was appointed by President Bongbong Marcos to the Department of Energy as an undersecretary in charge of securing the country's energy facilities.

== Early life and education ==
Born in La Paz, Iloilo City, he finished preschool at the Assumption Iloilo, finished elementary school at St. Clements College Iloilo, and finished high school at the University of the Philippines Visayas (UPV) Iloilo City in 1981, and stayed at the UPV for almost two years, as an industrial engineering student, before attending the Philippine Military Academy (PMA) in 1983 and graduated as "Magna Cum Laude" (Class Salutatorian) in 1987. He was awarded various distinctions during his graduation, such as the Secretary of National Defense Saber; the Flag Officer in Command, Philippine Navy Saber; Military Sciences Plaque, Mathematics Plaque, among other plaques.

He holds a Master of Economics at the De La Salle University in Manila, and a Master of Management in Defense Studies and completed the Australian Command and Staff Course at the Australian Defence College in Canberra, Australia. He also completed the Civil Military Approaches to Maritime Security Course in Monterey, California, courses at the Naval War College at Newport, Rhode Island, as well as other courses both locally and abroad, such as earning a Graduate Certificate in Maritime Studies at the University of Wollongong in New South Wales, Australia in 2005, a Maritime Security Cooperation Course at HMAS Penguin, in Mosman, New South Wales, Australia in 2011, a Civil Military Approaches to Maritime Security Course at the Naval Postgraduate School in Monterey, California in 2017, a Certified Trainor Certificate of Stephen Covey’s 7 Habits of Highly Effective People Course for earning in 2010, a certificate from the Development Academy of the Philippines, and completed a leadership course at the Ateneo de Manila University (ADMU) Center for Leadership and Change, Inc.

== Military background ==
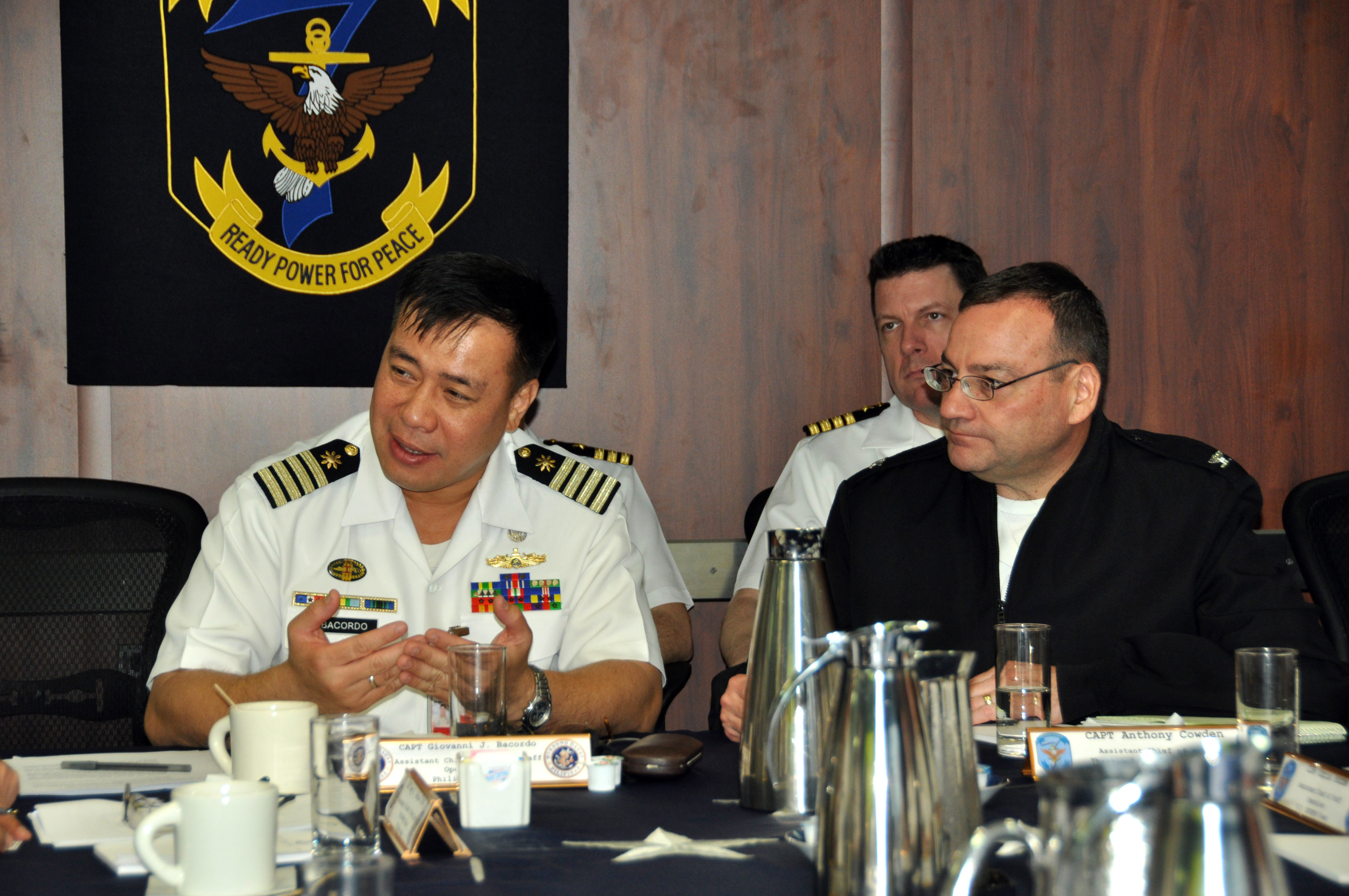
Then Captain Bacordo in 2014

After graduating at the PMA in 1987, he was assigned to command major ships of the Philippine Navy such as the BRP Juan Magluyan (PC-392), the BRP Rafael Pargas (PC-379), BRP Miguel Malvar (PS-19), and the BRP Rajah Humabon (PS-11). He was also assigned to lead naval forces, such as the Naval Task Force 41 of the AFP Western Command, Naval Task Force 61 and the Naval Task Force ZAMBASULTA of the AFP Western Mindanao Command, Joint Task Force Kingfisher and the Naval Forces Southern Luzon of the AFP Southern Luzon Command.

He also served as Assistant Chief of Naval Staff for Operations, N3, in 2013 to 2014, where he oversaw naval operations in the 2013 Lahad Datu standoff, as well as encounters of Chinese Ships at the Ayungin Shoal and in Scarborough Shoal, the sinking of the MV St. Thomas Aquinas, the Zamboanga Siege, the 2013 Bohol earthquake, and the Typhoon Haiyan. He also served as Director of the Center for Naval Leadership and Excellence, where he is a member of the navy commanders who devised the Strategic Sail Plan 2020, the Philippine Navy's primary transformation and organizational development strategy, and the Active Archipelagic Defense Strategy (AADS), the navy's strategic modernization program, which aims to modernize the entire Philippine Navy through the acquisition of new assets, such as frigates, submarines, corvettes, fast attack crafts, patrol boats, auxiliary vessels, shore based missile systems and air defense systems, and additional amphibious vehicles and naval aircraft.

He also served as Deputy Commander for Fleet Operations of the Naval Forces Western Mindanao; Deputy Commander of the Naval Forces West; and the naval public information officer and spokesman. He also led the Naval Sea Systems Command and the Philippine Fleet in April 2019, before being appointed as the new flag officer-in-command of the Philippine Navy on February 3, 2020. As the chief of the Philippine Navy, he pushed for a “modern mindset” and a "modern system" set to be implemented to every sailor and marine, as the navy undergoes a modernization program; strict implementation of fields of specialization for officers and enlisted personnel's skills in order to utilize the troops' overall effectiveness towards the navy's overall missions and its modernization; and the sustainment suite for new platforms, weapons and sensors of the Fleet and the Marines, in order to fulfill its mandate and its long-term goal to build a modern, credible and effective navy. He earned his third star and was promoted to vice admiral on April 22, 2020. The position of Flag Officer-in-Command was changed to Chief of the Navy in June 2020.

During his term as the Chief of the Philippine Navy, he also oversaw the overall naval operations amidst the effects of the COVID-19 pandemic in the Philippines, the arrival of the 2 Jose Rizal-class frigates, the completion of the mission preparedness training of the navy's two AgustaWestland AW159 Wildcat anti-submarine helicopters; the negotiations for the submarine acquisition project and other asset acquisition projects, which were delayed due to the Pandemic; and the planned acquisition of 5 Cyclone-class patrol ships from the United States Navy. He spearheaded the rehabilitation of the Philippine Navy Museum at Fort San Felipe, Cavite in October 2020.

He retired from military service on June 8, 2021, after reaching the mandatory retirement age of 56 and reached a total of 38 years (including 4 years as a cadet at the PMA) in military service, and he was replaced by his deputy, Rear Admiral Adelius Bordado.

== Awards and decorations ==

1st row	Commander Philippine Legion of Honor	7 Distinguished Service Stars with four bronze anahaw clusters	Distinguished Navy Cross medals
2nd row	1 Distinguished Service Medal	Meritorious Achievement Medal	2 Gawad sa Kaunlaran medals with one bronze anahaw cluster
3rd row	2 Bronze Cross Medals	2 Silver Wing Medals with one bronze anahaw cluster	Military Merit medals with 5 bronze spearhead devices (25 total medals)
4th row	1 Sagisag ng Ulirang Kawal	Military Civic Action Medals with one bronze anahaw cluster	Parangal sa Kapanalig ng Sandatahang Lakas ng Pilipinas with one bronze anahaw cluster
5th row	7 Military Commendation Medal with 4 bronze triangular devices	Long Service Medals with two campaign star	Anti-dissidence Campaign Medal with three campaign stars
6th row	Luzon Anti-Dissidence Campaign Medals with two campaign stars	Visayas Anti-Dissidence Campaign Medals	Mindanao Anti-Dissidence Campaign Medals with two campaign stars
7th row	Jolo and Sulu Anti-Dissidence Campaign Medals	Kalayaan Island Group Campaign Medal	Disaster Relief and Rehabilitation Operations Ribbon with three campaign stars

Right Side:

1st row	Philippine Republic Presidential Unit Citation	People Power I Unit Citation	People Power II Unit Citation

Badges and Other Awards:

- Combat Commander's Badge (Philippines)
- Naval War College Badge
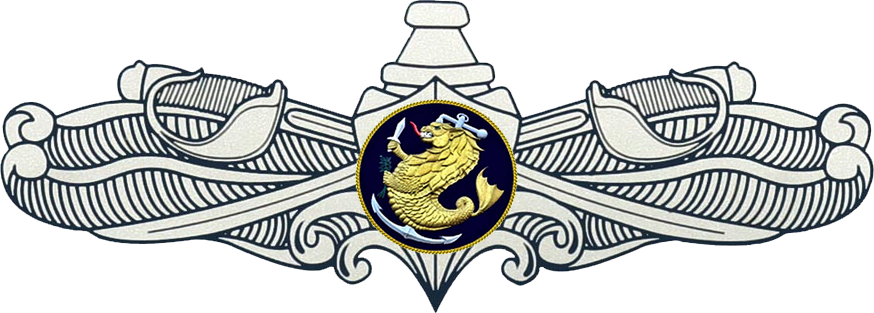
- Naval Surface Warfare Badge
- Australian Command and Staff College Badge
- Philippine Fleet Commander Badge
- Flag Officer-in-Command of the Philippine Navy Commander Badge

== Personal life ==
He is also a member of various organizations at the University of the Philippines Visayas, such as being a member of the Board of Directors of “I am UP High” of the UP Iloilo High School at Iloilo City. Known by his peers as "Joby", he is married to Rachel Cruz, and they have 5 children (2 sons and 3 daughters).
