= Alan Javier =

Filipino admiral (born 1970)

- Born: Alan Madrid Javier; May 16, 1970 (age 56); Naga City, Camarines Sur, Philippines
- Education: Philippine Military Academy (BS); Australian Defense Force Academy (MMS)
- Spouse: Daisy P. Javier
- Children: 2 daughters
- Military career
- Allegiance: Philippines
- Branch: Philippine Navy
- Service years: 1992 – Present
- Rank: Vice Admiral
- Service number: O-11015
- Commands: Flag Officer-in-Command of the Philippine Navy; AFP Western Command; Chief of Naval Staff; Naval Forces West; Fleet Support Group; Naval Task Force 61; Naval Task Group 80.5; Naval Task Group Zamboanga; Naval Task Group Central; Naval Task Group 61.1; BRP Rajah Humabon (PS-11); BRP Miguel Malvar (PS-19); BRP Bonny Serrano (PG-111); BRP Apollo Tiano (PG-851)

Alan Madrid Javier is a Philippine Navy vice admiral who serves as the 42nd and incumbent Flag Officer-in-Command (FOIC) of the Philippine Navy since 13 November 2026. Prior to his designation to the post, Javier served as the former commander of the AFP Western Command from 26 April 2026 to 13 November 2026, Chief of Naval Staff from 28 October 2024 to 26 April 2026, Naval Forces West, and as the Deputy Commander for Fleet Operations - Naval Forces Western Mindanao.

Javier was born and raised in Naga City, Camarines Sur and later graduated at the Philippine Military Academy in 1992 as part of the Tanglaw-Diwa Class. As a seasoned surface warfare and logistics officer, Javier commanded 4 ships and 4 naval task groups under Naval Forces Western Mindanao and Naval Forces Central, before being named as the Assistant Chief of Naval Staff for Logistics (N4).

== Early life and education ==
Javier was born in Naga City, Camarines Sur, and was raised in Barangay San Vicente, Libmanan, Camarines Sur. Javier later entered the Philippine Military Academy (PMA) in 1988 and later graduated as a member of the PMA Tanglaw Diwa Class of 1992. Javier also holds a Master of Management Studies (MMS), major in logistics management at the University of New South Wales at the Australian Defense Force Academy in Canberra, Australia, and completed both Command and General Staff Course and the Senior Executive Course on National Security at the National Defense College of the Philippines in Camp Aguinaldo, Quezon City.

== Military career ==
Javier was commissioned as an ensign on 1 April 1992 and later served under various ships during his junior years. Javier would later build his career as a seasoned surface warfare officer as he later skippered two patrol gunboats, namely the BRP Apollo Tiano (PG-851) and the BRP Bonny Serrano (PG-111), before commanding the patrol corvette BRP Miguel Malvar (PS-19) and the patrol frigate BRP Rajah Humabon (PS-11), the Navy's former flagship.

Following his stint in commanding various naval ships, Javier would later gain experience in logistics, counter-terrorism, humanitarian assistance and naval defense operations, as he later commanded various naval task forces and naval task groups stationed within the areas of Western Mindanao and the Visayas. Javier led four naval task groups such as the Naval Task Group 61.1, Naval Task Group Central, Naval Task Group Zamboanga, and the Naval Task Group 80.5, the Navy's deployable task force for international and regional maritime exercises.

Javier was later appointed in various staff positions such as the Assistant Chief of Naval Staff for Logistics (N4) and as the Deputy Commander for Fleet Operations at Naval Forces Western Mindanao (NFWM), before being named as the commander of the Fleet Support Group. Javier would later serve as the commander of the Naval Forces West, where he oversaw the AFP Western Command's role in the implementation of the AFP Kalasag Territorial Defense Plan framework. Javier also led various naval sovereignty patrols and territorial defense operations in the West Philippine Sea.

Following his stint as commander of Naval Forces West, Javier was later named as the Chief of Naval Staff from 28 October 2024 to 26 April 2026. During his stint as the Chief of Naval Staff, Javier strengthened naval cooperation with like-minded countries while advancing the Navy's missile capabilities, promoting maritime security, and naval cooperation with other navies such as the Pakistan Navy. Javier was later named as commander of the AFP Western Command (WESCOM) from 26 April 2026 to 13 November 2026. As WESCOM commander, Javier strengthened the AFP's maritime domain awareness and sustained the AFP's presence in West Philippine Sea amid rising tensions between the Philippines and China.

On 13 November 2026, Javier was appointed as the 42nd Flag Officer-in-Command (FOIC) of the Philippine Navy and replaced Vice Admiral Jose Maria Ambrosio Ezpeleta, who retired from military service following the end of his 2-year fixed term. On his assumption speech, Javier vowed to continue Ezpeleta's directives in both the navy's role in the Comprehensive Archipelagic Defense Concept (CADC) and the navy's modernization goals, while also transforming the navy into a "stronger, more capable, and mission-ready force". Javier also named his four main pillars as his leadership thrust for the Navy: sustain operational readiness, building a future-ready navy, human capital investment, and strengthening partnerships and interoperability initiatives with allies and government agencies.

== Awards and decorations ==
- Distinguished Service Star with one silver anahaw leaf
- Meritorious Achievement Medal with four bronze anahaw leaves
- Distinguished Service Medal
- Chief of Staff, AFP Commendation Medal
- Gawad sa Kaunlaran
- Military Merit Medal with two bronze spearhead devices
- Military Merit Medal with two gold anahaw leaves
- Military Merit Medal with four bronze anahaw leaves
- Sagisag ng Ulirang Kawal
- Military Civic Action Medal with one bronze anahaw
- Parangal sa Kapanalig ng Sandatahang Lakas ng Pilipinas with two bronze anahaws
- Military Commendation Medal with one silver and two bronze triangle clasps
- Presidential Security Service Ribbon

=== Campaign and service medals ===
- AFP Long Service Medal
- Anti-dissidence Campaign Medal with four campaign stars
- Luzon Anti-dissidence Campaign Medal with two campaign stars
- Visayas Anti-Dissidence Campaign Medal
- Mindanao Anti-dissidence Campaign Medal with one campaign star
- Jolo and Sulu Campaign Medal
- Kalayaan Island Group Campaign Medal
- Disaster Relief and Rehabilitation Operations Ribbon with four service stars

=== Unit Decorations ===
- Philippine Republic Presidential Unit Citation
- People Power II Unit Citation

=== Badges ===
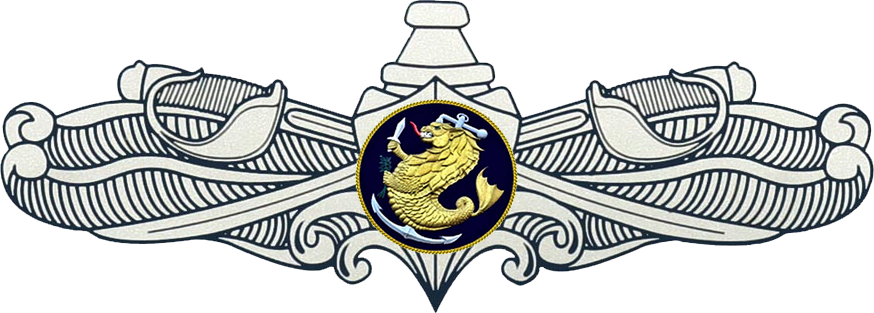
- - Philippine Navy Surface Warfare Badge
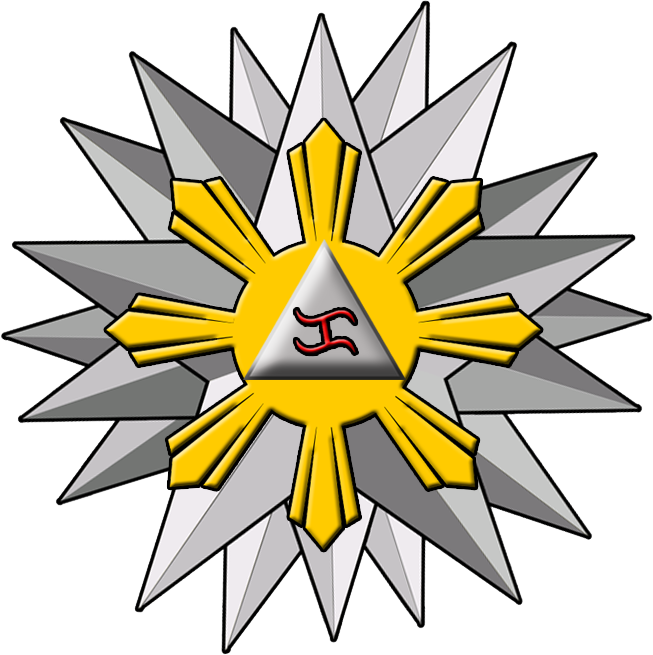
- AFP Command & General Staff Course Badge
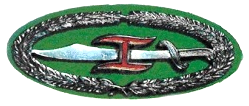
- Combat Commander's Kagitingan Badge

== Personal life ==
Javier is married to Daisy P. Javier and they have two daughters.
