= Toribio Adaci Jr. =

40th Chief of the Philippine Navy

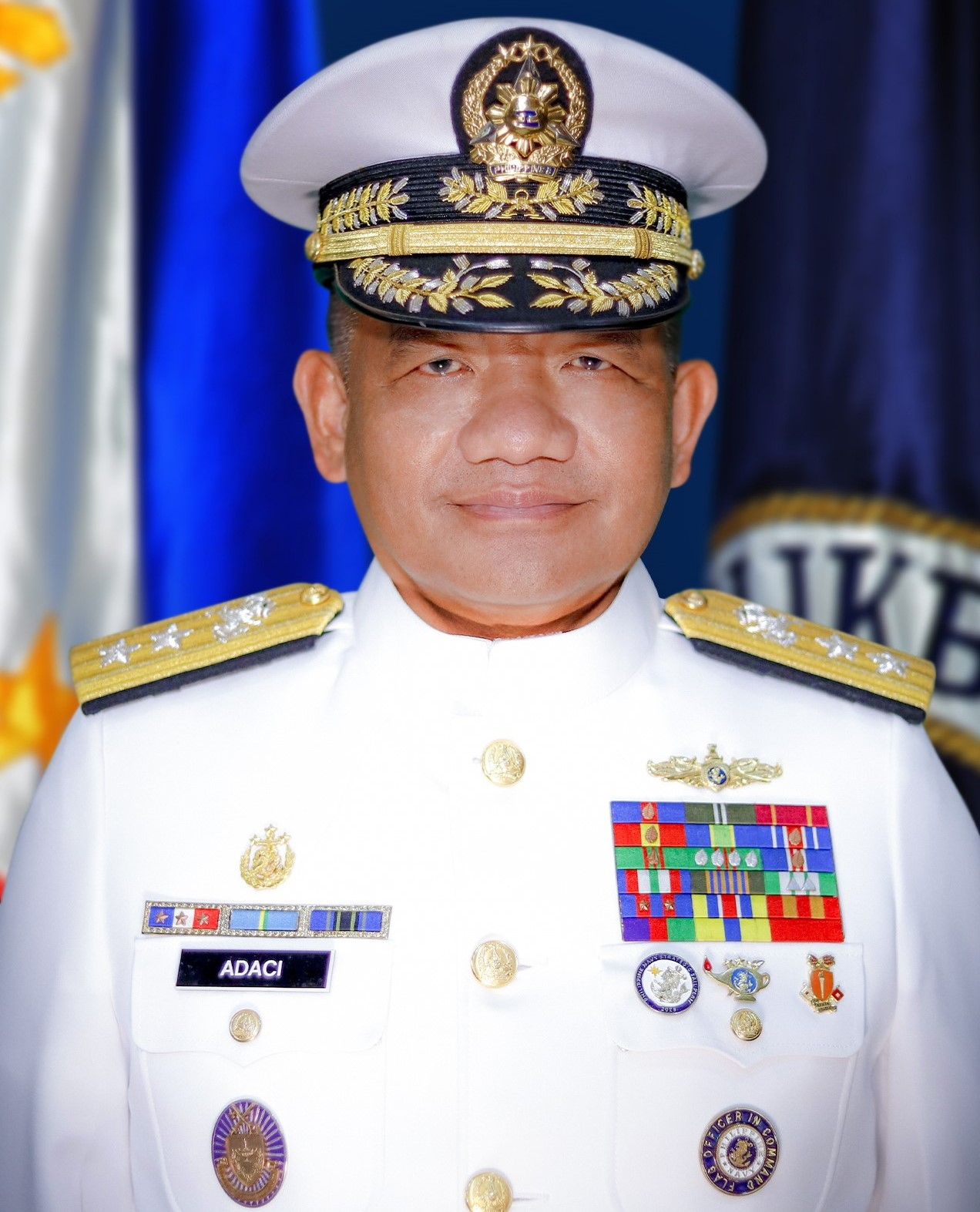
- Official portrait, 2022
- Born: January 21, 1967 (age 59); Kiangan, Ifugao
- Education: Philippine Military Academy (BS); Development Academy of the Philippines (MPM); National Defense University (MNRS)
- Military career
- Allegiance: Philippines
- Branch: Philippine Navy
- Service years: 1989–2024
- Rank: Vice Admiral
- Service number: O-10087
- Commands: Flag Officer-in-Command of the Philippine Navy; Naval Forces Western Mindanao; Naval Installation Command; Fleet-Marine Ready Force; Fleet Inspector General; Naval Task Force 31; Naval Task Group 41.3; Naval Task Group 62.1; Naval Task Group Central; Naval Task Group Basilan; Naval Task Group 61.2; Naval Task Group 61.1; BRP Apolinario Mabini (PS-36); BRP Pangasinan (PS-31); BRP Boni Serrano (PC-111); BRP Sulpicio Fernandez (PG-853)

Toribio Dulinayan Adaci Jr. (born January 21, 1967) was a Philippine Navy vice admiral who served as the 40th Flag Officer-in-Command (FOIC) of the Philippine Navy. Prior to his appointment, Adaci previously commanded the Naval Forces Western Mindanao from 2020 to 2022, the Naval Installation Command, and Fleet-Marine Ready Force.

== Early life and education ==
Born in Kiangan, Ifugao, Adaci joined the Philippine Military Academy (PMA) in 1985 and graduated as part of the PMA Makatao Class of 1989. After his graduation, Adaci completed various domestic command and staff courses, such as the Naval Command and Staff Course at the Naval Education and Training Command in Naval Station San Miguel in 2001, the AFP Command and General Staff Course at the Armed Forces of the Philippines Command and General Staff College in 2010, and the Senior Executive Course on National Security at the National Defense College of the Philippines in 2016.

Adaci also completed various courses abroad, such as the Junior Officer Strategic Studies Course at the Royal Australian Naval College, HMAS Creswell in Jervis Bay Village, Australia, and the Information Systems Management Course at the US Army Signal School, in Fort Gordon, Georgia, United States. He also has a master's degree in Public Management, Major in Development and Security from the Development Academy of the Philippines, a master's degree in National Resource Strategy at the National Defense University in Washington, D.C., USA and a Bachelor of Laws degree, and allowed him to pass the board exams in 2000.

== Military career ==
Adaci served at various posts within the navy and the PMA, as he is primarily specialized in naval operations, education and training, and personnel management and administration skills. After being placed in various staff and aboard ship posts, Adaci commanded two patrol gunboats and two corvettes, namely the BRP Sulpicio Fernandez (PG-853), BRP Boni Serrano (PC-111), BRP Pangasinan (PS-31), and BRP Apolinario Mabini (PS-36). He also served as an Instructor and Tactical Officer at the PMA, as well as Chief of the Discipline, Law and Order (DLO) Branch in the Office of the Assistant Chief of Naval Staff for Personnel, N1, Administrative Officer in the Office of the FOIC, and as Operations Officer of Naval Combat Systems Center at the Naval Sea Systems Command.

Adaci primarily served under many naval groups throughout the country, primarily within the Zamboanga Peninsula and Soccsksargen areas, where he served as task group commander of the Naval Task Group 61.1, Naval Task Group 61.2, Naval Task Group Basilan, Naval Task Group Central, Naval Task Group 62.1, wherein all the naval task groups are under the command of the Naval Forces Western Mindanao (NFWM). He also led the Naval Task Group 41.3, under Naval Forces West (NFW). After his command stints within different naval task groups and naval ships, Adaci was awarded the Command-at-Sea Badge in 2012 and the Senior Command-at-Sea Badge in 2017. Meanwhile, his staff assignments include being named as The Naval Provost Marshal, Assistant Chief of Naval Staff for Personnel, N1, and as Deputy Commander of Naval Forces Southern Luzon where he also served the concurrent post of Commander of Naval Task Force 31. Adaci also served as the Deputy Commander for Administration of the AFP Western Mindanao Command. Adaci's command in task group deployments overseas include being names as Task Group Commander in anticipation of the Philippine Navy's participation in the 2011 Brunei International Defense Exhibit (BRIDEX), held at the BRIDEX International Conference Centre in Jerudong, Brunei, and as Task Force Commander during the Navy's participation in the 2017 Langkawi International Maritime and Aerospace Exhibition (LIMA) at the Langkawi International Airport in Malaysia.

In 2018, Adaci was named as commander of the Fleet-Marine Ready Force, where he spearheaded 11 International Defense and Security Engagements (IDSE), including the Philippine Navy's first participation during the Rim of the Pacific (RIMPAC) Exercise in Hawaii, the Navy's first-ever port visit in Vladivostok, Russia, and the first-ever participation of the Philippine Navy in a naval exercise with China, which were all held throughout in 2018. In 2020, he also inspected the overall planning and deployment of the Naval Task Force 82, which consisted the BRP Ramon Alcaraz (PS-16) and the BRP Davao del Sur (LD-602) to the Middle East as part of the repatriation missions for stranded overseas Filipino workers (OFWs) displaced by the US-Iran crisis due to the assassination of Qasem Soleimani. The same task force was also deployed in another assistance mission that assisted the humanitarian operations of OFWs affected by the COVID-19 lockdowns in Sri Lanka and India. The mission was the farthest mission of the Philippine Navy in its history.

Adaci was named as the commander of Naval Forces Western Mindanao on 30 October 2020, where he led the overall naval humanitarian missions in the midst of the COVID-19 pandemic in the country, as well as the shipment of the COVID-19 vaccines throughout Western Mindanao in 2021. Adaci also led the intensified operations against terrorism and smuggling, as he supervised a naval operation on 24 January 2022, which led the interception of P9.7 million worth of smuggled cigarettes off the coasts Sulare Island in Parang, Sulu, and another related operation on 25 November 2022, where ₱52.8 million worth of smuggled cigarettes were confiscated. The operations also led to the surrender of various individuals who served as members of the New People's Army and the Abu Sayyaf. Adaci also led rescue operations on stranded ships and boats due to inclement weather and ship breakdowns mid-sea, as well as during the onslaught of Typhoon Rai, locally known as Typhoon Odette. Adaci also oversaw various cooperation and training exercises within the Sulu Sea, such as the "Pagsisikap 2021" & "Pagsisikap 2022" exercises, and the 2021 & 2022 Southeast Asian Cooperation and Training (SEACAT) exercises.

On 24 November 2022, Adaci was named as the new Flag Officer-in-Command of the Philippine Navy, replacing the Acting Flag Officer-in-Command Rear Admiral Caesar Bernard Valencia, the Vice Commander of the Philippine Navy. As Flag Officer-in-Command, Adaci vowed to strengthen the Navy's forces through supporting the modernization program, while intensifying naval operations within the West Philippine Sea. Adaci was promoted to vice admiral on January 12, 2023.

Adaci Jr. terminated his tour of duty as the first FOIC three-year termer (Republic Act No. 11709) with a military parade and review on November 8 at the Philippine Military Academy.

== Awards in military service ==
- Officer, Philippine Legion of Honor
- Distinguished Service Star
- Distinguished Navy Cross
- Silver Cross
- Meritorious Achievement Medal
- Distinguished Service Medal
- Gawad sa Kaunlaran
- Bronze Cross Medal
- Military Merit Medal with one bronze spearhead device
- Military Merit Medal with four bronze anahaws
- Sagisag ng Ulirang Kawal
- Military Civic Action Medal
- Parangal sa Kapanalig ng Sandatahang Lakas ng Pilipinas
- Military Commendation Medal with three silver triangle clasps
- AFP Long Service Medal
- Anti-dissidence Campaign Medal
- Luzon Anti-dissidence Campaign Medal
- Visayas Anti-Dissidence Campaign Medal
- Mindanao Anti-dissidence Campaign Medal
- Kalayaan Island Group Campaign Medal
- Disaster Relief and Rehabilitation Operations Ribbon

=== Unit Decorations ===
- Philippine Republic Presidential Unit Citation
- People Power I Unit Citation
- People Power II Unit Citation

=== Badges ===
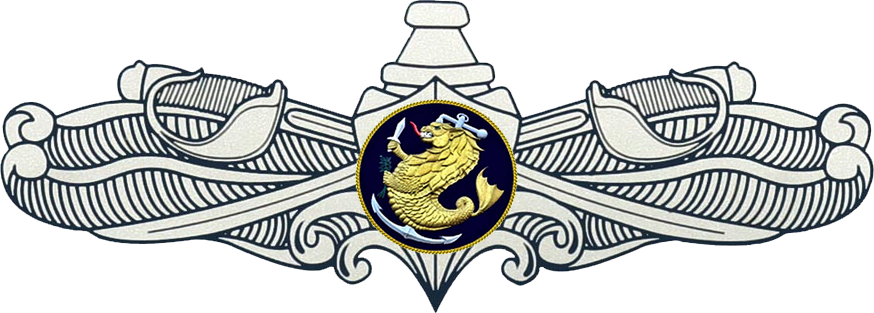
- - Philippine Navy Surface Warfare Badge
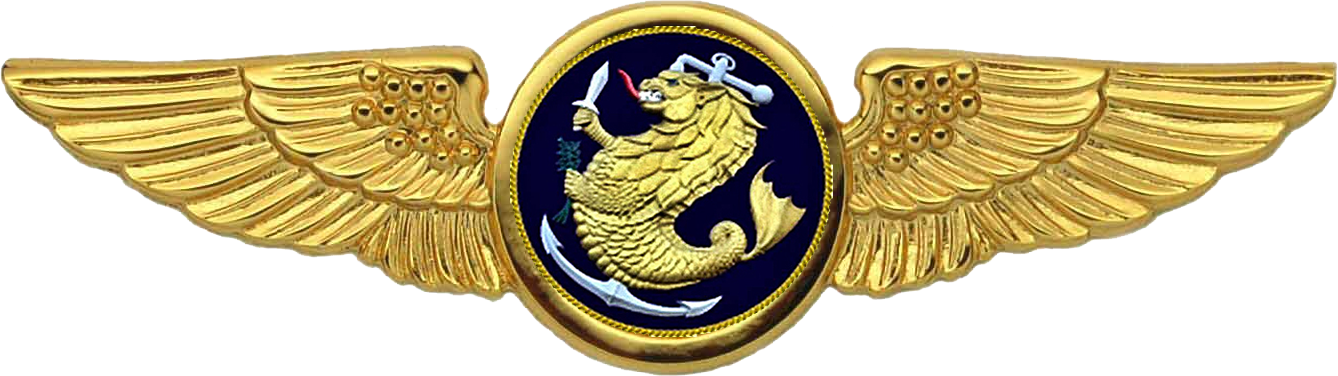
- Naval Aircrew Badge
- Philippine Navy SEAL Team Badge
- Philippine Navy Strategic Sail Plan 2028 Badge
- Naval Command at Sea Badge

== Personal life ==
Adaci is often known by his friends and peers as "Jun". Adaci is married to Mercy Khristin A. Adaci and they have a daughter, Thea Karylle.

Military offices
Preceded by Caesar Bernard Valencia; Acting	Chief of the Philippine Navy; 2022–present	Incumbent
