= Jose Maria Ambrosio Ezpeleta =

Philippine Navy admiral

Jose Ma. Ambrosio Ezpeleta
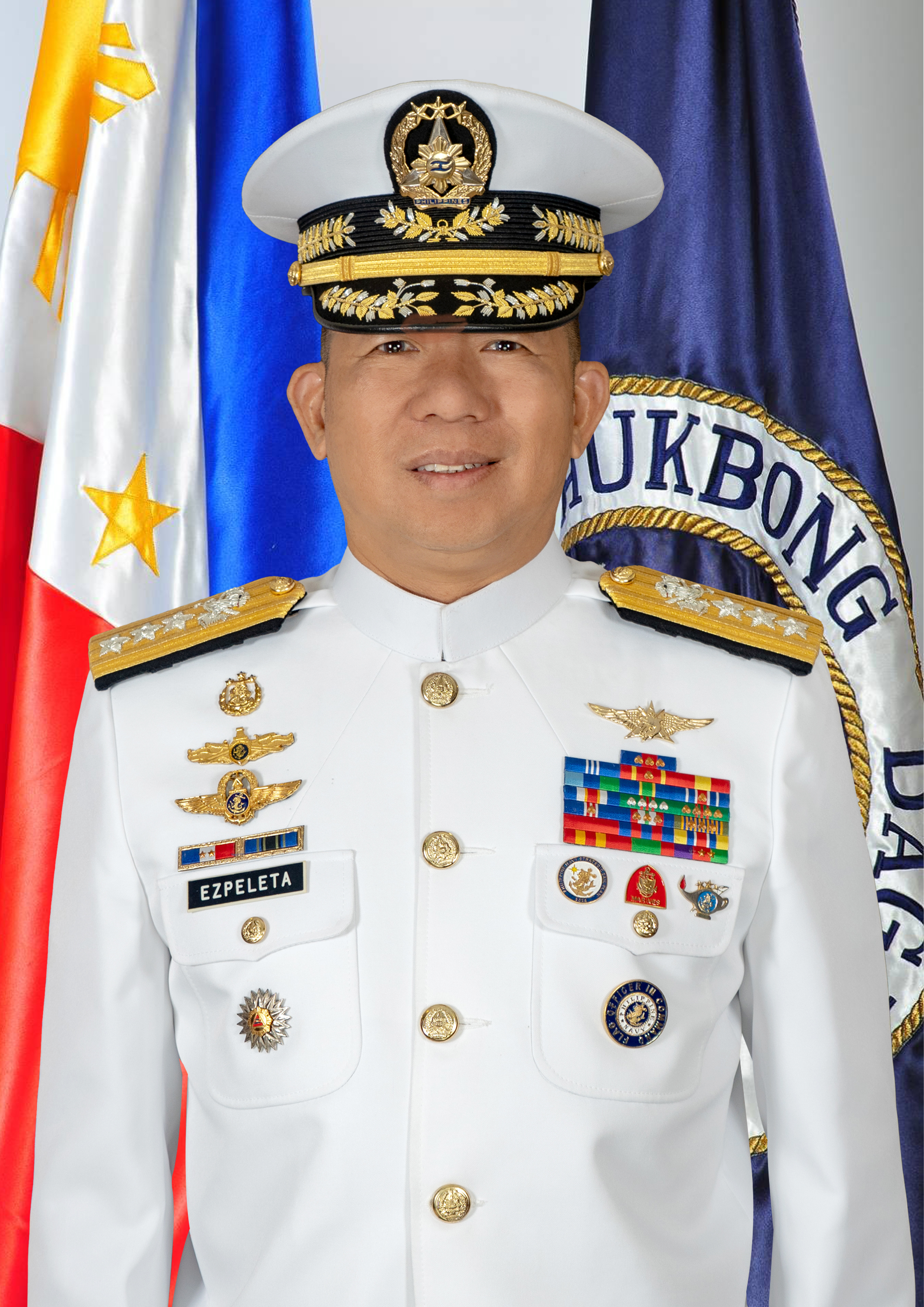
- Official portrait, 2025
- Born: Jose Maria Ambrosio Quiatchon Ezpeleta; March 8, 1970 (age 56); Cotabato City, Philippines
- Education: Philippine Military Academy (BS); Development Academy of the Philippines (MPA)
- Military career
- Allegiance: Philippines
- Branch: Philippine Navy
- Service years: 1991 – 2026
- Rank: Vice Admiral
- Nickname: "Toto"
- Service number: O-10684
- Commands: Flag Officer-in-Command of the Philippine Navy; Vice Commander of the Philippine Navy; Chief of Naval Staff; Naval Forces Southern Luzon; Superintendent, Naval Officers School Center; Naval Task Force Seahawk; Naval Task Force 71; BRP Quezon (PS-70); BRP Miguel Malvar (PS-19); BRP Nicolas Mahusay (PC-119); BRP Bagobo (AT-293)

Jose Maria Ambrosio Quiatchon Ezpeleta is a Philippine Navy vice admiral who served as the 41st Flag Officer-in-Command (FOIC) of the Philippine Navy from 15 November 2024 to 13 November 2026. Prior to his appointment to the post as the FOIC of the Navy, Ezpeleta served as the Vice Commander of the Philippine Navy, the Chief of Naval Staff, and as commander of the Naval Forces Southern Luzon.

== Early Life and education ==
Ezpeleta was born on 8 March 1968 in Cotabato City and is the only son among three siblings. He would later enter the Philippine Military Academy on May 1987 and later graduated as part of the PMA "Sambisig" Class of 1991. Ezpeleta holds a Master of Public Administration (MPA), Major in Development and Security at the Development Academy of the Philippines and also completed the Naval Command and Staff Course at the Naval Command and Staff Course at the Naval Education and Training Command in 2002, the AFP Command & General Staff Course at the Armed Forces of the Philippines Command and General Staff College in 2012, the International Surface Warfare Course at the Naval War College and the Rule of Law and Disciplined Officers Course at the US Defense Institute of International Legal Studies, both held in Newport, Rhode Island. Ezpeleta also finished the Combined Force Maritime Component in Pearl Harbor, Hawaii, USA.

== Military career ==
After graduating the PMA, Ezpeleta entered the Philippine Navy as a newly minted Ensign. Ezpeleta would later serve under various ships during his junior years, and would later command a variety of navy ships. Ezpeleta skippered the BRP Bagobo (AT-293), BRP Nicolas Mahusay (PC-119), BRP Miguel Malvar (PS-19), and the BRP Quezon (PS-70). Through these feats, Ezpeleta was later awarded the Command-at-Sea Badge for his competence, skills and experience in maritime operations and strategic planning. Ezpeleta would later serve under various commands in Southern Luzon and Davao Regions, and would later took helm of various commands in the Navy, primarily in naval squadron units, education, training and doctrine positions, and personnel positions, such as the Superintendent of the Naval Officers School Center and as Assistant Chief of Naval Staff for Personnel (N1). Ezpeleta also commanded the Naval Task Group 71 and the Naval Task Force Seahawk, both under the Naval Forces Eastern Mindanao.

On 16 December 2016, Ezpeleta would later serve as the Deputy Commander of Naval Forces Eastern Mindanao, and served this position until 21 December 2018, where he was later placed as the Deputy Commander of the Naval Education, Training and Doctrine Command, where he served the post until 1 July 2019. Ezpeleta was promoted to the rank of commodore on 2019, where he served as the commander of Naval Forces Southern Luzon from 6 September 2019 to 9 August 2022. During his stint as commander, he was part of the units who were responsible for the implementation of lockdowns during COVID-19 community quarantines in Southern Luzon, and led humanitarian assistance operations during the aftermath of Typhoon Goni.

Ezpeleta was later named as the Chief of Naval Staff on 9 August 2022 to 14 August 2024 and was promoted to the rank of rear admiral. During his stint as Chief of Naval Staff, Ezpeleta represented the Philippine Navy in a variety of meetings and engagements with high-ranking officials from overseas countries, such as attending the formal dinner with then-United States Pacific Fleet Commander Admiral Samuel Paparo on Honolulu, Hawaii on 9 September 2023, which is aimed to strengthen the navy's ties with US and other foreign counterparts, and meeting with the then-Acting Commander of the US I Marine Expeditionary Force Major General Bradford Gering on 8 November 2023, which is aimed to sustain collaboration efforts between the Philippine Navy and the United States Marine Corps for future bilateral joint exercises and training initiatives.

Ezpeleta would later serve as the 57th Vice Commander of the Philippine Navy on 14 August 2024 to 15 November 2024. During his stint as Vice Commander, Ezpeleta welcome the newly installed French Attaché Capt. Stephan Litzler as part of his introductory call to the country, and also participated the meetings for the Exercise Sama Sama with officials from the US, Australia, Canada, France, Japan and the United Kingdom.

On 15 November 2024, Ezpeleta was appointed as the 41st Flag Officer-in-Command of the Philippine Navy. During his assumption speech, Ezpeleta vowed to continue the navy's modernization programs, defend the country's waters, and enhance the navy's external operations under the adoption of the AFP's Comprehensive Archipelagic Defense Concept with the Navy's Active Archipelagic Defense Strategy. Ezpeleta also vowed to enforce the navy's role under the ratification of both the Maritime Zones Act and the Philippine Archipelagic Sea Lanes Act.

On 9 January 2025, Ezpeleta became the first Flag Officer-in-Command to undergo the Special Call to Arms of the Philippine Marine Corps and later earned his Marine Corps Badge. Ezpeleta later earned his third star and was promoted to vice admiral on 16 January 2025. On 19 March 2025, the navy laid out its plans to boost the navy's surface and air defense warfare capabilities and eyes technology transfers agreements with the Italian Navy, which is aimed to boost the country's Self Reliance Defense Posture initiatives. On 20 March 2025, Ezpeleta met with the Chief of Staff of the Japan Maritime Self-Defense Force Admiral Akira Saitō, and announced its commitment to boost the relationship between the two navies in addressing future potential threats. Ezpeleta also continued expanding the navy's maritime operations, naval readiness for navy and marine forces, and logistical support, alongside the development of local-made unmanned systems under the Undersea Capability Development Program, integration of joint operations with other service branches, and naval modernization efforts, which included the commissioning of new vessels such as the BRP Miguel Malvar (PS-19), BRP Diego Silang (FFG-7), BRP Rajah Sulayman (PS-20, and the BRP Albert Majini (PG-909). Ezpeleta also led the navy's thrust towards external comprehensive archipelagic defense, while also increasing defense cooperation and joint exercises with allied countries and likeminded nations. Ezpeleta's programs also included the construction of the Cyber Laboratory and Security Operations Center and the Naval Monitoring Station Panggungan in Tawi-Tawi. Ezpeleta retired from military service on 13 November 2026, and he was awarded by the commander of the AFP Western Command Vice Admiral Alan Javier.

== Awards in military service ==
- Commander, Philippine Legion of Honor, awarded on 13 November 2026 (for his dedication, demonstrative commitment to the core values of the Navy, and service during his term as the FOIC,PN)
- Legionnaire, Philippine Legion of Honor
- Outstanding Achievement Medal
- Distinguished Service Star with three silver anahaw leaves
- Gawad sa Kapayapaan
- Distinguished Navy Cross
- Meritorious Achievement Medal
- Distinguished Service Medal
- Chief of Staff, AFP Commendation Medal
- Gawad sa Kaunlaran
- Bronze Cross Medal
- Silver Wing Medal
- Military Merit Medal with two silver spearhead device
- Military Merit Medal with one gold anahaw
- Sagisag ng Ulirang Kawal with one bronze anahaw
- Military Civic Action Medal with two bronze anahaws
- Parangal sa Kapanalig ng Sandatahang Lakas ng Pilipinas with two bronze anahaws
- Military Commendation Medal with three silver triangle clasps

=== Campaign and Service Medals ===
- AFP Long Service Medal
- Anti-dissidence Campaign Medal with three campaign stars
- Luzon Anti-dissidence Campaign Medal
- Visayas Anti-Dissidence Campaign Medal with one campaign star
- Mindanao Anti-dissidence Campaign Medal with one campaign star
- Disaster Relief and Rehabilitation Operations Ribbon with three service stars

=== Unit Decorations ===
- Philippine Republic Presidential Unit Citation
- People Power II Unit Citation

=== Badges ===
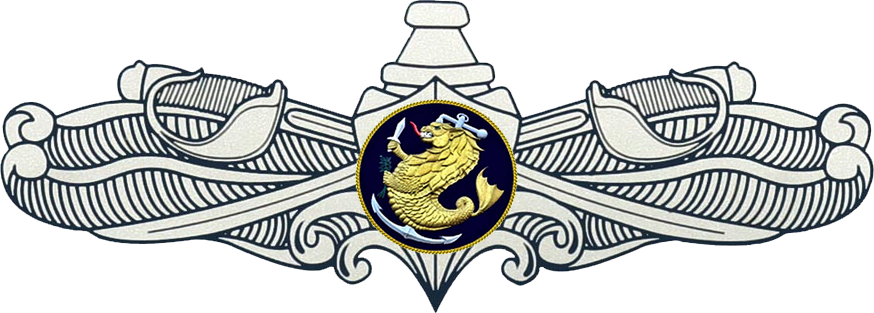
- - Philippine Navy Surface Warfare Badge
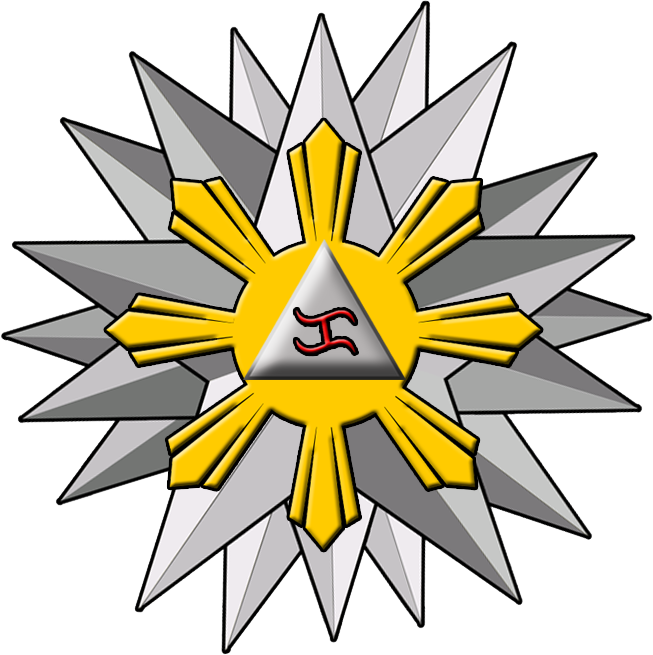
- AFP Command & General Staff Course Badge
- Honorary Command Naval Aviator’s Badge
- Philippine Navy Honorary SEAL Team Badge
- Marine Corps Badge.
- Naval Command at Sea Badge

== Personal life ==
Ezpeleta is known by his close friends and relatives as "Toto". Ezpeleta is married to Marie Venus "Pinky" Expeleta and they have two sons. He is a known hobbyist and his interests include music and fishing. Ezpeleta is also known to be a motorbike enthusiast and often does motorcycle trips during his free time.
