= Robert Empedrad =

Filipino government official and former Navy admiral

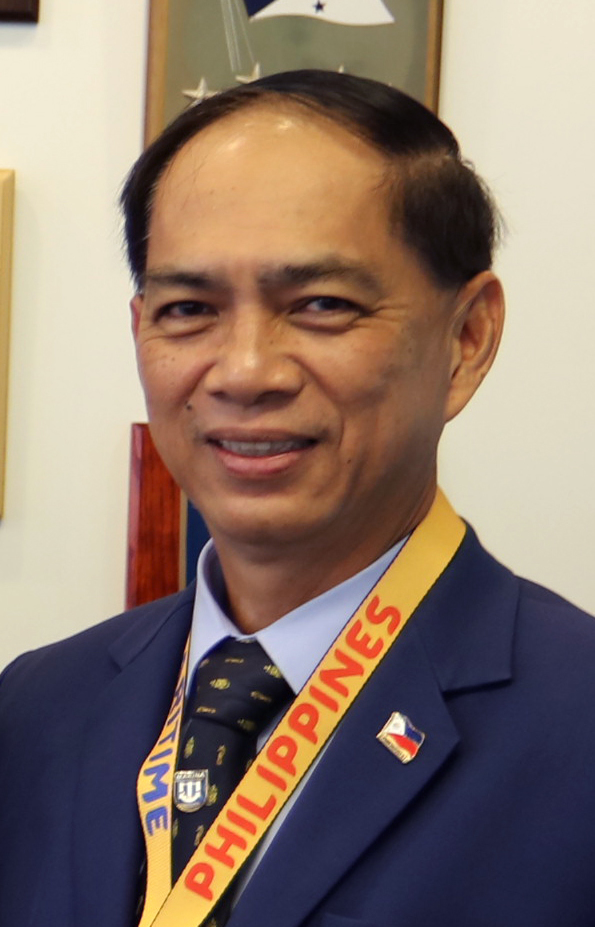

Administrator of the Maritime Industry Authority
- In office March 2, 2020 – July 1, 2022
- President: Rodrigo Duterte
- Preceded by: Rey Leonardo Guerrero; Narciso A. Vingson Jr. (OIC)
- Succeeded by: Hernani Fabia

37th Flag Officer-in-Command of the Philippine Navy
- In office December 19, 2017 – February 3, 2020
- President: Rodrigo Duterte
- Preceded by: V. Adm. Ronald Joseph Mercado
- Succeeded by: V. Adm. Giovanni Bacordo

Personal details
- Born: February 3, 1964 (age 62) Tuguegarao, Cagayan, Philippines
- Education: Philippine Military Academy

Military service
- Allegiance: Philippines
- Branch/service: Philippine Navy
- Years of service: 1986–2020
- Rank: Vice Admiral
- Unit: Flag Officer-in-Command of the Philippine Navy; Deputy Chief of Staff for Reservist and Retirees Affairs (J9); Offshore Combat Force; Naval Operations Center; Naval Task Force Sea Hawk; Naval Task Group 72, NAVFORWESM; Naval Task Group 62.2, NAVFORWESM; Naval Task Group 62.1, NAVFORWESM BRP Dagupan City (LS-551); BRP Iloilo (PS-32); BRP Magat Salamat (PS-20); BRP Abraham Campo PC-396; BRP Felix Apolinario (PC-395)
- Battles/wars: Moro conflict Communist rebellion in the Philippines

Robert Arugay Empedrad (born February 3, 1964) is a retired Philippine Navy admiral who served as the Administrator of the Maritime Industry Authority (MARINA) under the Duterte administration. He previously served as the Flag Officer-in-Command of the Philippine Navy from 2017 to 2020. He is a graduate of the Philippine Military Academy "Sinagtala" Class of 1986.

== Early life and education ==
Robert Empedrad first studied at Tuguegarao North Central School, and at Cagayan National High School. He also studied Civil Engineering at) in Baguio and applied in the Philippine Military Academy in 1982 and graduated in 1986. He also earned a Master in Business Administration, at the Philippine Christian University, Dasmariñas, Cavite, and took the US Naval Staff Course at US Naval War College, in Newport, Rhode Island, as well as took the Senior Executive Course for National University and Senior Strategic Leadership Programme at the Defence Academy of the United Kingdom. He also took up various courses such as the International Riverine and Coastal Operations at Naval Amphibious Base Coronado at San Diego, California; the Instructor’s Training Course at Naval Special Warfare Center in Coronado, California; the Hermeneutics and Bible Study Course and the Christian Teachers Training Course, both in Las Piñas City.

== Military career ==
Throughout his career, Empedrad commanded various ships and naval task forces in the Philippine Navy, in leading ships like the BRP Felix Apolinario (PC-395), BRP Abraham Campo, BRP Magat Salamat (PS-20), BRP Iloilo, BRP Dagupan City (LS-551), and task forces in the Naval Forces Western Mindanao like the Naval Task Group 62.1, the Naval Task Group 62.2, and the Naval Task Group 72. He also commanded the Naval Task Force Sea Hawk, where he led operations against smugglers with the assistance of the Bureau of Fisheries and Aquatic Resources of the Department of Agriculture. He also led humanitarian operations during Tropical Storm Washi and Typhoon Bopha.

He also commanded various positions in the Philippine Navy such as, Chief of Staff of Naval Forces Eastern Mindanao (2006–2007), Director, Naval Operations Center (2007), Assistant Chief of Naval Staff for Intelligence, N2 (2007–2009), Deputy Commander of Naval Intelligence Security Force (2009), Assistant Chief of Naval Staff for Personnel, N1 (2009–2011), Deputy Commander of Naval Forces Eastern Mindanao (2011–2013), Commander, Bonifacio Naval Station (2013–2015), the Commander, Offshore Combat Force, Philippine Fleet (Feb 2015 – Dec 2016), the Deputy, Commander Philippine Fleet (Dec 2016 –Feb 2017) and the Deputy Chief of Staff for Reservist and Retirees Affairs, J9 at General Headquarters and Headquarters Service Command (GHQ & HSC). As well as the Chairman of Defense Acquisition System Assessment Team (DASAT), in charge of the updates on Navy Ships and the Frigate Acquisition Project, which came to a controversy that replaced his predecessor Vice Admiral Ronald Joseph Mercado for alleged insubordination over the controversy regarding the Jose Rizal-class frigates.

As Philippine Navy chief, he redesignated and downgraded the roles of the Navy's ships in order to prepare for the navy's modernization, as the navy awaits the delivery of the upcoming ships and retired 4 vintage ships: the BRP Rajah Humabon (PS-11), the BRP Sultan Kudarat (PS-22), BRP Cebu (PS-28), and the BRP Quezon (PS-70), along with two gunboats: the BRP Bienvenido Salting (PC-112), and the BRP Nicolas Mahusay (PC-119), which drew criticisms, due to the decreasing number of ships being used and being retired, despite having only a token of ships to fulfill the navy's mandate. During his term, the navy succeeded in acquiring the BRP Conrado Yap (PS-39), 6 units the Multipurpose Assault Craft MK. 3 equipped with Spike MLS ER Launchers and Mini-Typhoon Weapon Stations, 8 units of the KAAV7A1 Assault Amphibious Vehicles, 5 TC-90 patrol aircraft, and 43 new vehicles. He also oversaw the donation of 4 Type 966Y class patrol boats from China. He also led overall naval operations during the 2020 Taal Volcano Eruption. He retired from military service on February 3, 2020, after reaching the mandatory military age of 56, and was replaced by then-Commander of the Philippine Fleet, Rear Admiral Giovanni Bacordo. He was appointed by President Rodrigo Duterte as the new administrator of the Maritime Industry Authority on March 2, 2020.

=== Controversy ===
In August 2024, Antonio Trillanes filed with the DOJ plunder under Republic Act No. 7080 and graft cases against Rodrigo Duterte, Bong Go, and Empedrad regarding the allegedly anomalous P16-billion contract of two frigates BRP Jose Rizal (FF-150) and BRP Antonio Luna (FF-151) with HD Hyundai Heavy Industries. He denied the accusation for it was signed two years after his retirement.

== Awards ==
Left Side:

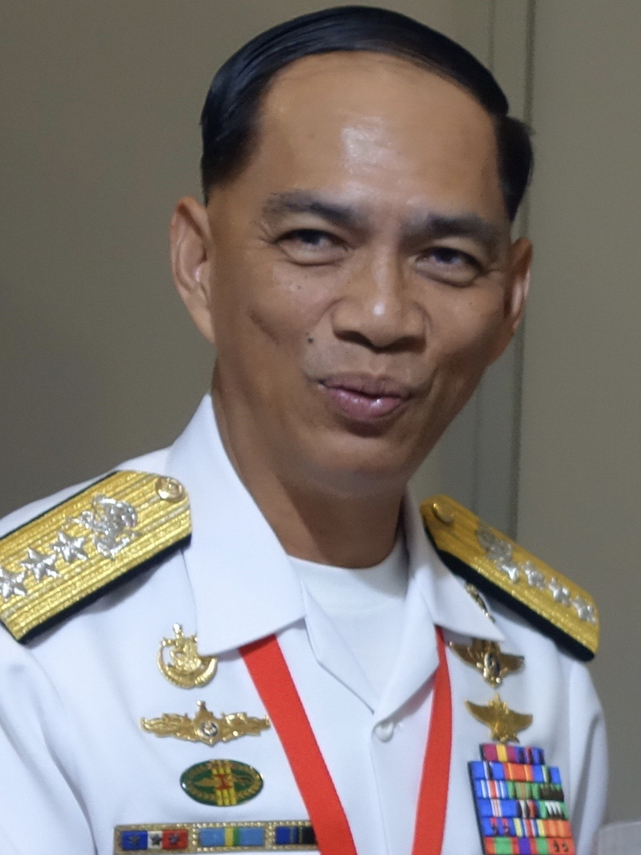
Empedrad in military uniform.

1st row	Commander Philippine Legion of Honor	1 Outstanding Achievement Medal	8 Distinguished Service Stars with three bronze anahaw clusters
2nd row	2 Distinguished Navy Cross medals with one bronze anahaw cluster	1 Meritorious Achievement Medal	Gawad sa Kaunlaran medals with one bronze anahaw cluster
3rd row	2 Bronze Cross Medals	Military Merit medals with 2 bronze spearhead devices (27 total medals)	Military Merit medals with 4 silver and 1 bronze anahaw clusters (27 total medals)
4th row	1 Sagisag ng Ulirang Kawal	Military Civic Action Medals	5 Military Commendation Medal with 4 bronze triangular devices
5th row	Long Service Medals with two campaign star	Anti-dissidence Campaign Medal with two campaign star	Luzon Anti-Dissidence Campaign Medals
6th row	Visayas Anti-Dissidence Campaign Medals	Mindanao Anti-Dissidence Campaign Medals with two campaign stars	Disaster Relief and Rehabilitation Operations Ribbon with three campaign stars

Right Side:

1st row	Philippine Republic Presidential Unit Citation	People Power I Unit Citation	People Power II Unit Citation

Badges and Other Awards:

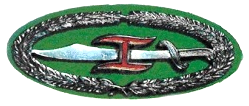
- Combat Commander's Badge (Philippines)
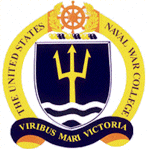
- Naval War College Badge
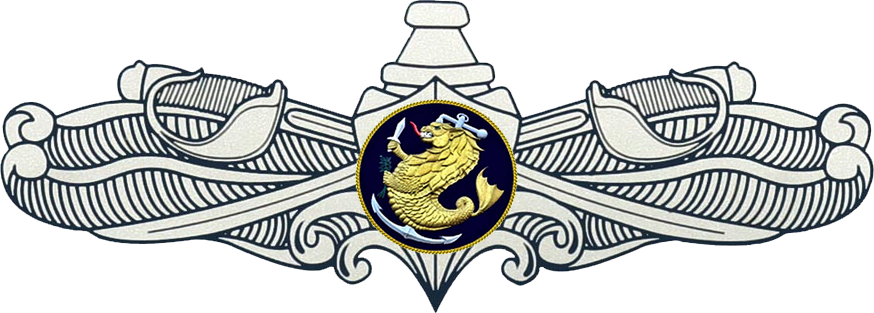
- Naval Surface Warfare Badge
- Gintong Medalya For Government Service Of The Dangal Ng Lahing Cagayano

== Personal life ==
He is married to Blessilda Empedrad, and they have a son, Jelome.
