= Commandant of the Philippine Marine Corps =

Highest-ranking officer in the Philippine Marine Corps

- Incumbent; BGen Bob R. Apostol since 5 October 2026
- Philippine Marine Corps
- Abbreviation: CPMC
- Reports to: Flag Officer-in-Command of the Philippine Navy
- Appointer: President of the Philippines
- Term length: Mandatory Retirement Age at 57
- Constituting instrument: Republic Act No. 11939
- Formation: 2 November 1950
- First holder: LTSG Manuel A. Gomez, PN
- Website: www.marinecorps.mil.ph

The Commandant of the Philippine Marine Corps (CPMC) is the highest-ranking officer in the Philippine Marine Corps. It is a two-star general position which holds the rank of major general and reports directly to the Flag Officer in Command of the Philippine Navy, wherein the Marines serve under the branch's authority. The Commandant is responsible for overall marine operations, organizational policies, planning, and recommendations for reforms and modernization of the attached service, as well as advising the President of the Philippines, the Secretary of National Defense, the AFP Chief of Staff, and the Flag Officer in Command relating to the Marine Corps matters and programs.

Under the Republic Act No. 11939, the Commandant, as part of the officers holding the rank of major general, will be subject to retirement upon reaching the age of 57 or upon the accumulation of over 30 years of military service and does not hold a fixed term length.

In case of a transition in the change of command of the Commandant, the Deputy Commandant serves as such in an acting capacity.

== List ==
No.	Name	Term of office			Ref.
No.	Name	Took office	Left office	Time in office	Ref.
1	LTSG. Manuel A. Gomez, PN	2 Nov. 1950	1 Aug. 1952	1 year, 273 days	
2	LCDR. Gregorio L. Lim, PN	1 Aug. 1952	21 Jul 1965	12 years, 354 days	
3	LCDR. Antonio G. Javier, PN	21 Jul 1965	28 Apr 1966	281 days	
4	CDR. Rodolfo M. Punsalang, PN	28 Apr 1966	27 May 1968	2 years, 29 days	
5	CDR. Rudiardo A. Brown, PN	27 May 1968	8 Sep 1968	104 days	
	LCDR. Rafael R. Rebudlo, PN	8 Sep 1968	21 Jul 1969	316 days	
7	CDR. Cesar C. Betita, PN	21 Jul 1969	30 Jul 1970	1 year, 9 days	
8	Commo. Rudiardo A. Brown, PN	30 Jul 1970	30 Jan 1973	2 years, 184 days	
9	B. Gen. Rodolfo M. Punsalang	30 Jan 1973	16 Oct 1984	11 years, 260 days	
10	B. Gen. Artemio A. Tadiar	16 Oct 1984	26 Feb 1986	1 year, 133 days	
11	B. Gen. Brigido T. Paredes	26 Feb 1986	23 Jul 1987	1 year, 147 days	
12	B. Gen. Rodolfo G. Biazon	23 Jul 1987	7 Aug 1989	2 years, 15 days	
13	B. Gen. Eduardo T. Cabanlig	7 Aug 1989	16 Dec 1993	4 years, 131 days	
14	B. Gen. Cesar C. Abella	16 Dec 1993	10 May 1994	145 days	
15	B. Gen. Guillermo R. Ruiz	10 May 1994	2 Mar 1996	1 year, 297 days	
16	Maj. Gen. Pociano S. Millena	2 Mar 1996	30 Sep 1998	2 years, 212 days	
17	Maj. Gen. Edgardo V. Espinosa	30 Sep 1998	6 May 1999	218 days	
18	B. Gen. Percival M. Subala	6 May 1999	24 Apr 2000	354 days	
19	Maj. Gen. Librado S. Ladia	24 Apr 2000	10 Jun 2003	3 years, 47 days	
20	Maj. Gen. Emmanuel R. Teodosio	10 Jun 2003	14 Jun 2004	1 year, 4 days	
21	Maj. Gen. Orlando G. Buenaventura	14 Jun 2004	21 Jun 2005	1 year, 7 days	
22	Maj. Gen. Renato P. Miranda	21 Jun 2005	26 Feb 2006	250 days	
23	Maj. Gen. Nelson N. Allaga	26 Feb 2006	24 Aug 2007	1 year, 179 days	
24	Maj. Gen. Ben D. Dolorfino	24 Aug 2007	16 Jul 2009	1 year, 326 days	
25	Maj. Gen. Juancho M. Sabban	16 Jul 2009	23 Aug 2010	1 year, 38 days	
26	Maj. Gen. Rustico D. Guerrero	23 Aug 2010	5 Apr 2013	2 years, 225 days	
27	Maj. Gen. Romeo T. Tanalgo	5 Apr 2013	3 Dec 2015	2 years, 242 days	
28	Maj. Gen. Remigio C. Valdez	3 Dec 2015	25 Aug 2016	266 days	
29	Maj. Gen. Andre M. Costales Jr.	3 Dec 2015	25 Aug 2016	266 days	
30	Maj.Gen. Emmanuel B. Salamat	25 Aug 2016	5 Sep 2017	1 year, 11 days	
31	Maj. Gen. Alvin A. Parreño	5 Sep 2017	15 October 2019	2 years, 40 days	
32	Maj. Gen. Nathaniel Y. Casem	15 October 2019	21 December 2020	1 year, 67 days	
33	Maj. Gen. Ariel R. Caculitan	21 December 2020	21 February 2022	1 year, 62 days	
34	Maj. Gen. Nestor C. Herico	21 February 2022	13 July 2022	142 days	
—	B. Gen. Raul Jesus L. Caldez (acting)	13 July 2022	16 August 2022	34 days	
35	Maj. Gen. Charlton Sean M. Gaerlan	16 August 2022	8 May 2023	265 days	
36	Maj. Gen. Arturo G. Rojas	8 May 2023	4 July 2025	3 years, 181 days	
37	Maj. Gen. Vicente MAP Blanco, III	4 July 2025	25 September 2026	1 year, 124 days	
—	BGen. Bayani V. Curaming (Officer-in-charge)	25 September 2026	5 October 2026	61 days	
38	BGen. Bob R. Apostol	5 October 2026	Incumbent	31 days	

== See also ==
- Chief of Staff of the Armed Forces of the Philippines
- Flag Officer-In-Command, Philippine Navy
