= Adeluis Bordado =

Former Flag Officer in-Command of the Philippine Navy

Adeluis Santelices Bordado
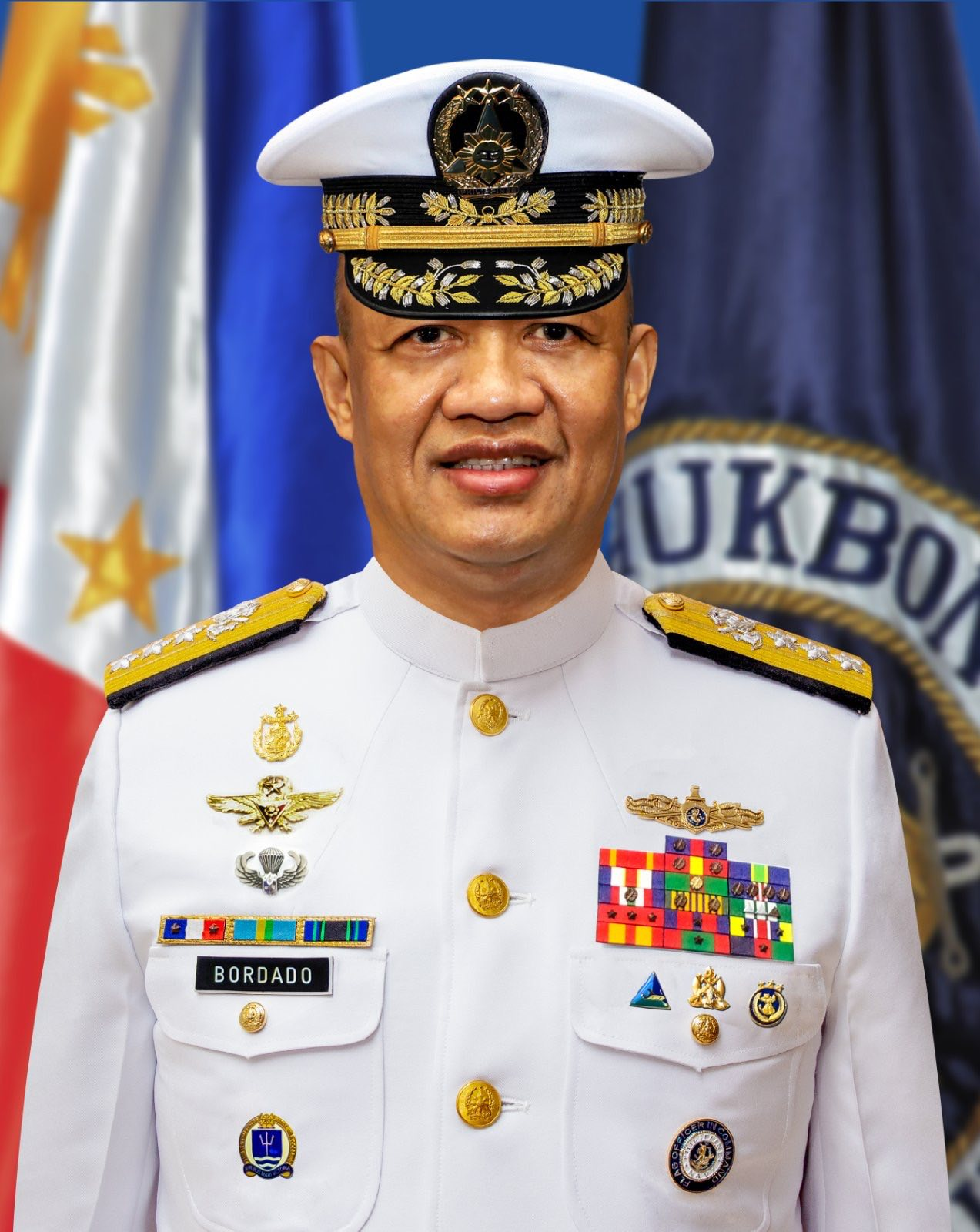
- Official portrait, 2021

39th Flag Officer in-Command of the Philippine Navy
- In office 8 June 2021 – 8 September 2022
- President: Rodrigo Duterte; Bongbong Marcos
- Preceded by: V. Adm. Giovanni Bacordo
- Succeeded by: R. Adm. Caesar Bernard Valencia (acting)

Personal details
- Born: September 9, 1966 (age 60) Calabanga, Camarines Sur, Philippines
- Education: Philippine Military Academy

Military service
- Allegiance: Philippines
- Branch/service: Philippine Navy
- Years of service: 1988 – 2022
- Rank: Vice Admiral
- Unit: Flag Officer in-Command of the Philippine Navy; Vice Commander, Philippine Navy; Chief of Naval Staff; AFP Education, Training and Doctrine Command; Naval Installation Command; Naval Forces Southern Luzon, SOLCOM; Sealift Amphibious Force; Bonifacio Naval Station; Naval Task Force 31, SOLCOM; Naval Intelligence and Security Group – Southern Luzon; Director, Naval Intelligence Training Institute; Administrator, Computer Office and Internet Systems, PMA; Superintendent, Fleet Training Center; BRP Rajah Humabon (PS-11); RPS Explorer; BRP Fort San Felipe (AM-700)
- Battles/wars: Moro conflict Communist rebellion in the Philippines

Vice Admiral Adeluis Santelices Bordado is a Filipino retired Admiral who served as the Flag Officer in-Command of the Philippine Navy from 8 June 2021 to 8 September 2022. Prior to his post, he served as the vice commander of the Philippine Navy, the Chief of Naval Staff and the AFP Education, Training and Doctrine Command (AFPETDC). He is a graduate of the Philippine Military Academy "Maringal" Class of 1988.

== Early life and education ==
Vice Admiral Bordado was born at San Roque, Calabanga, Camarines Sur on 9 September 1966. He is a son of a family of a public school teacher, and is the third child of his six siblings. He entered the Philippine Military Academy (PMA) in 1984, and graduated as the Top 4 of the "Maringal" Class of 1988.

After graduating the PMA, Admiral Bordado took various courses locally and abroad, such as the Naval Officers Qualification Course (NOQC) ‘A’, at the Fort San Felipe, where he graduated as the Top 1 of his class; the Foreign Officer Supplementary List Executive Course (FOSLEX) at the Royal Australian Naval College, HMAS Creswell in New South Wales, Australia; the Basic Airborne Course (BAC Class 77–96) at the Naval Special Forces School in Naval Base Cavite; the Naval Command and Staff Course (NCSC Class 44) at the Naval Education and Training Command (NETC) in Zambales; the Naval Intelligence Officer's Course (NIOC Class 58) at the Naval Intelligence Training Institute (NITI); the AFP Comptrollership Course 14; Command at Sea Course 3–06 at the Navy's Fleet Training Center; and the Command and General Staff Course Class 48 at the Armed Forces of the Philippines Command and General Staff College. He also studied at the Naval Command College (NCC 2012) at United States Naval War College (USNWC), and the Combined Forces Maritime Component Commander (CFMCC Course 19-1c) at the Naval Station Pearl Harbor in Hawaii.

== Military career ==
Vice Admiral Bordado was commissioned as an ensign after his graduation at the PMA in 1988, and is described as a well-rounded officer, as he was assigned to various positions in the Philippine Navy and in the Armed Forces of the Philippines, relatively in naval squadrons, naval operations, intelligence, information technology, budgeting, operational planning, and education and training positions. He held his first command-at-sea position as he skippered the BRP Fort San Felipe (AM-700), a signals intelligence (SIGINT) ship of the Naval Intelligence and Security Force. He also skippered the RPS Explorer, a research vessel of the Mines and Geosciences Bureau under the Department of Environment and Natural Resources (DENR), and the BRP Rajah Humabon (PS-11), the Philippine Navy's former flagship.

Vice Admiral Bordado also served other positions and titles, such as the administrator for computer office and Internet systems at the Philippine Military Academy; as chief of five various branches (the Plans and Budget Branch, the Production Branch, the Operations Control Branch, the Administration Branch, and Technical Intelligence Branch) in the Office of the Naval Staff, N2, at the Headquarters, Philippine Navy; the director of Naval Intelligence Training Institute; and the commander of Naval Intelligence and Security Group-Southern Luzon. He also served as an instructor and course director of various courses at the PMA, NETC and NITI. He also served as the superintendent of the Fleet Training Center; the assistant chief of naval staff for education and training, N-8; the deputy commander of Naval Forces Southern Luzon, while simultaneously fulfilling his duty as the commander of Naval Task Force 31; and as commander of the Bonifacio Naval Station.

Bordado was promoted to rank of commodore in 2017, and served as the commander of the Sealift Amphibious Force; commander of Naval Forces Southern Luzon; and commander of the Naval Installation Command. He earned his second star and was promoted to the rank of rear admiral in 2019, and served as the commander of Armed Forces of the Philippines Education, Training and Doctrine Command (AFPETDC); the Chief of Naval Staff, the third highest post of the navy in May 2020; and as the vice commander, Philippine Navy, the navy's second highest post, in December 2020.

On June 8, 2021, Bordado assumed his post as the 39th Flag Officer in-Command of the Philippine Navy, replacing Vice Admiral Giovanni Bacordo. As the Chief of the Philippine Navy, he vows to continue his predecessor's programs through "continuity and change" and also affirms his plans to upgrade the navy's education and training systems to boost the Navy's competence. He earned his third star and was promoted to the rank of vice admiral in July 2021.

== Awards and decorations ==
Vice Admiral Bordado has received the following awards:

Left Side

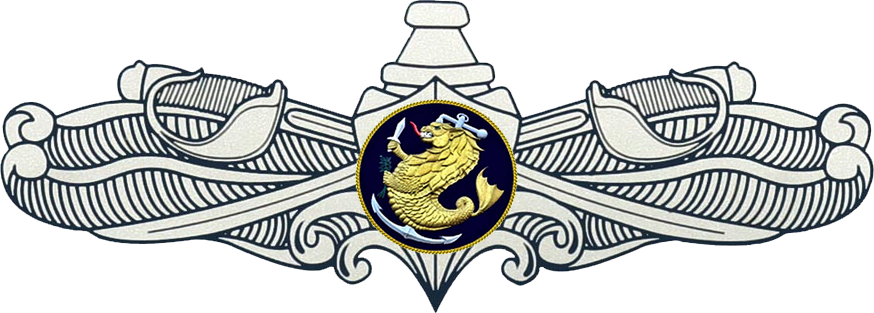
No Badge | No Badge | No Badge
No Badge

| Badges | Naval Surface Warfare Badge | | |
| 1st row | | Distinguished Service Stars with two bronze anahaw clusters | Meritorious Achievement Medal |
| 2nd row | Distinguished Service Medals with two bronze anahaw clusters | Gawad sa Kaunlaran | Silver Wing Medal |
| 3rd row | Military Merit Medals with one gold anahaw | Sagisag ng Ulirang Kawal with four bronze anahaw clusters | Military Civic Action Medals |
| 4th row | Parangal sa Kapanalig ng Sandatahang Lakas ng Pilipinas | Military Commendation Medals | Long Service Medals with three campaign stars |
| 5th row | Anti-dissidence Campaign Medal with one campaign star | Luzon Anti-Dissidence Campaign Medals with two campaign stars | Visayas Anti-Dissidence Campaign Medals |
| 6th row | Mindanao Anti-Dissidence Campaign Medals with one campaign stars | Unknown Ribbon | Disaster Relief and Rehabilitation Operations Ribbon with one service star |
| Badges | - | - | - |
| Badge | Flag Officer-in-Command Badge | | |

Right Side

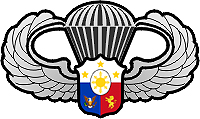
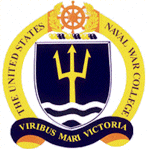
No Badge

Naval Command at Sea Badge
Philippine Air Force Gold Wings Badge
| Philippine Republic Presidential Unit Citation | People Power I Unit Citation | People Power II Unit Citation |
Naval War College Badge

== Personal life ==
Admiral Bordado is the first cousin of Camarines Sur 3rd District Representative Gabriel Bordado. Known by his peers as "Adel", he is married to Ma. Ruth Bordado, a licensed physician and psychiatrist. The couple have one son, Adeluis Antovic Bordado Jr. His primary interests are in education and teaching.
