= Alberto Carlos =

Philippine Navy vice admiral

Commander of the Armed Forces of the Philippines' Western Command
- In office January 24, 2022 – November 20, 2024
- President: Rodrigo Duterte; Bongbong Marcos
- Succeeded by: Major general 19th Commander of Westmincom Antonio Gustilo Nafarrete, acting capacity

Personal details
- Born: December 1967 (age 58)
- Education: United States Naval Academy

Military service
- Allegiance: Philippines
- Branch/service: Philippine Navy
- Years of service: 1989 – present
- Rank: Vice Admiral
- Unit: Philippine Fleet; Western Command

Alberto Bernardo Carlos (born December 1967) is a vice admiral in the Philippine Navy who headed the Armed Forces of the Philippines–Western Command (AFP–WESCOM).

== Education ==
Carlos graduated from the Philippine Military Academy in 1989 as part of the Makatao class.

The PMA would send him to the United States Naval Academy in 1989, obtaining a bachelor's degree in computer science with merit.

He also attended China's Naval Command College in Nanjing in 2008 as part of an intergovernmental program. He finished a general staff course.

== Career ==
Carlos have headed the Philippine Fleet of the Philippine Navy and served as the Armed Forces of the Philippines (AFP) Deputy Chief of Staff for Logistics.

=== Western Command ===
Then-President Rodrigo Duterte appointed Carlos to head the Armed Forces of the Philippines–Western Command on January 17, 2022. He officially assumed the position on January 24, when his predecessor Roberto Enriquez reached the mandatory retirement age of 56. The position deals with the Philippines' military engagements which involves it's sovereign claims in the South China Sea territorial dispute.

He had been personally been on board in resupply mission by the Philippines for features they occupy in the South China Sea such as the mission for Second Thomas Shoal in December 2023 and another in February 2024 where he sustained injury from water canons fired by China Coast Guard ships.

He was supposed to end his career in December 2023, after reaching the mandatory retirement age of 56 but was given a one-year extension. On November 20, 2024, he was succeeded by Major general of 19th Commander Westmincom Antonio Gustilo Nafarrete in an acting capacity upon the retirement of Lt. General William Gonzales.

==== Supposed China 'new model' agreement and removal ====
On May 7, 2024, Alfonso Torres Jr. was appointed as acting commander of WESCOM after Carlos went on a leave. This is around the same period that China and its embassy in Manila claimed the Philippines agreed on a supposed "new model" agreement brokered by Carlos and an anonymous Chinese diplomat on dealing tensions in the Second Thomas Shoal. On May 7 and 8 respectively, Bloomberg and the Manila Times published articles revolving around the deal based on an alleged transcript of the interaction which reportedly occurred in January 2024.

Torres' role would be made permanent and Carlos' removal was officially characterized as motivated by an "administrative decision". No formal probe was conducted on him by the AFP out of respect on him being on leave.

In a Senate inquiry, Carlos would admit to having a conversation but denied it was about such "new model" and insist he did not consent to the interaction being recorded. He said he was expecting a customary New Year's wishes with the Chinese military attache with the embassy whom he identified as "Colonel Li". Carlos said they did discuss reducing tensions in the South China Sea in general without committing to a new model or similar agreement as China is insinuating. On 18 May 2024, Carlos was eventually replaced by then-Rear Admiral Alfonso Torres Jr.

== Personal life ==
Alberto has an older brother in the Philippine National Police; Dionardo Carlos who served as Police Chief.
