= BRP Rafael Pargas =

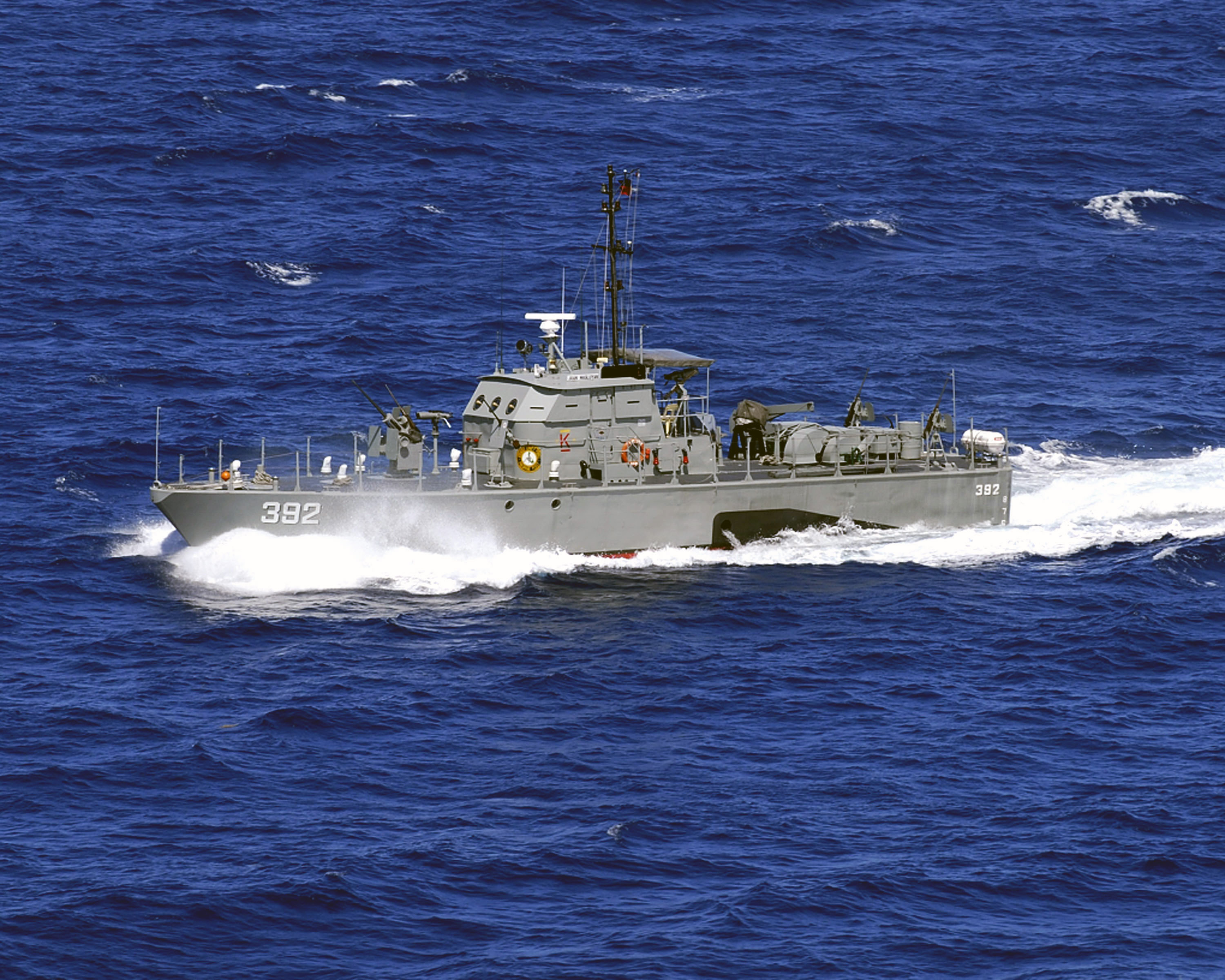
- BRP Juan Magluyan, another Jose Andrada-class patrol craft.

History

Philippines
- Name: BRP Rafael Pargas (PC-379)
- Operator: Philippine Navy
- Ordered: March 1993
- Builder: Trinity-Equitable Shipyards, New Orleans, USA
- Acquired: 1 February 1995
- Commissioned: 1 June 1995
- Reclassified: April 2016: from PG-379 to PC-379
- Status: in active service

General characteristics
- Class & type: Jose Andrada class
- Type: Coastal Patrol Craft
- Displacement: 56.4 tons full load
- Length: 78 ft (24 m)
- Beam: 20 ft (6.1 m)
- Draft: 5.8 ft (1.8 m)
- Propulsion: 2 × 1,400 bhp Detroit 16V-92TA Diesel Engines (Note: All sources refer to the same engine, although with different horsepower rating. But official specs from manufacturer indicates a 1,400 hp rating for each engine.); 2 × 35-kW Diesel generators; 2 shafts
- Speed: 28 knots (52 km/h) maximum
- Range: 1,200 nmi (2,200 km) at 12 knots (22 km/h)
- Boats & landing craft carried: 4-meter rigid inflatable boat at aft
- Complement: 12
- Sensors & processing systems: Raytheon AN/SPS-64(V)11 Navigation / Surface Search Radar
- Armament: 1 × Mk.38 Mod.0 Bushmaster 25mm chain gun; 4 × Mk.26 M2HB Browning 12.7 mm/50-cal. GP machine guns; 2 × M60 7.62 mm/30-cal. GP machine guns

BRP Rafael Pargas (PC-379) is the ninth ship of the Jose Andrada class coastal patrol boats of the Philippine Navy. It is part of the second batch of its class ordered through US Foreign Military Sales (FMS) in 1993, and was commissioned with the Philippine Navy on 1 June 1995. It was initially designated as Fast Patrol Craft, and was numbered "DF-379", but later on was re-designated as a Patrol Gunboat, and was finally re-numbered as "PG-379". Another round of reclassification was made in April 2016, which redesignated the patrol gunboat as the coastal patrol craft "PC-379".

The vessel is named after Rafael Pargas, a graduate of the US Naval Academy, who became the executive officer for Donald Blackburn's World War II guerrilla force.

== Technical details ==
The ship was built to US Coast Guard standards with aluminum hull and superstructure. She is powered by two Detroit Diesel 16V-92TA Diesel Engines with a combined power of around 2,800 hp driving two propellers for a maximum speed of 28 knots (52 km/h). Maximum range is 1,200 nmi (2,200 km) at 12 knots (22 km/h), or alternatively 600 nmi (1,100 km) at 24 knots (44 km/h).

The ship originally designed to carry one bow Mk.3 40 mm gun, one 81 mm mortar aft, and four 12.7 mm/50 caliber machine guns. Instead, she is armed with one 25mm Bushmaster chain gun on Mk.38 Mod.0 mount, four M2HB Browning 12.7 mm/50 caliber machine guns on Mk.26 mounts, with two positioned forward and two aft; and two M60 7.62 mm/30 caliber machine guns, both mounted amidships. The ship can carry 4,000 rounds of 12.7 mm and 2,000 rounds of 7.62 mm A large "Big Eyes" binocular is also carried on tripod mounts, one on the forecastle and one just above the mast.

As part of the second batch (PG-379 to PG-395), it is equipped with Mk.38 Mod.0 M242 Bushmaster 25mm chain gun that the first batch of ships do not carry.

She is equipped with a Raytheon AN/SPS-64(V)11 surface search and navigation radar but with a smaller antenna as those used in bigger Philippine Navy ships. Like all other Philippine Navy ship, she was installed with the Philippine Navy Vessel Tracking System (VTS) by the Naval Sea Systems Command.

A 4-meter rigid inflatable boat powered by a 40-hp outboard motor is stowed amidships.
