= Chief of the Navy (Philippines) =

Highest-ranking officer of the Philippine Navy

Flag Officer-in-Command of the Philippine Navy
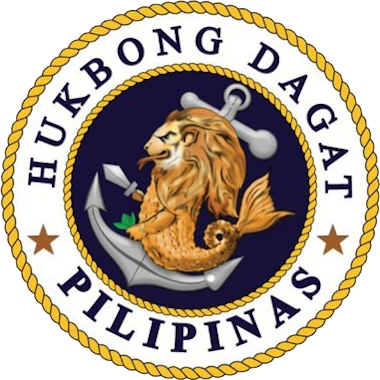
- Incumbent; Vice Admiral Alan M. Javier since November 13, 2026
- Philippine Navy
- Abbreviation: FOIC-PN
- Reports to: Chief of Staff of the Armed Forces of the Philippines
- Residence: Naval Station Jose Francisco, Fort Bonifacio, Taguig City, Philippines
- Appointer: President of the Philippines with the consent of the Commission on Appointments
- Term length: 2 years
- Constituting instrument: Republic Act No. 11939
- Formation: May 20, 1898
- Deputy: Vice-Commander of the Philippine Navy; Chief of Naval Staff

The Flag Officer-in-Command (FOIC) is the overall commander and senior admiral of the Philippine Navy, the naval warfare branch of the Armed Forces of the Philippines. It is normally held by a three-star rank of Vice Admiral. He has operational control and is responsible for overall operations of the service, including the Philippine Marine Corps, and directly reports to the Chief of Staff of the Armed Forces of the Philippines.

== Powers and Responsibilities ==
The Flag Officer-in-Command of the Philippine Navy serves as the overall head of the Philippine Navy, where he/she has full operational control and command of the Navy is primarily in charge of the overseeing, directing, and managing the navy's daily activities, naval operations, administrative functions, and overall resource management from the navy's enlisted personnel, naval units and up to the navy's different commands.

The FOIC directly reports to the Chief of Staff of the Armed Forces of the Philippines and serves as the primary advisor for the Secretary of National Defense in naval matters, which will also be transmitted to the President of the Philippines, who serves as the Commander-in-Chief. The FOIC is also responsible for the navy's strategic planning towards long-term goals, ensuring that the navy can capable and effective in addressing the command's needs, such as the Navy's modernization programs, naval doctrine development, and addressing the professional and welfare programs of the command.

The FOIC also manages humanitarian assistance operations of the navy's units and international collaboration efforts to other navies in the region.

== Organization and Term Limit ==
The FOIC is directly assisted by two deputies, namely the Vice-Commander of the Philippine Navy, who serves as the FOIC's immediate assistant, and the Chief of Staff, Philippine Navy. The Vice-Commander also has the power to assist the FOIC in their absence, while the Chief of Staff serves as the overall head of the navy's organizational staff, and is responsible in managing the navy's administrative commands and offices.

The FOIC is directly appointed by the President of the Philippines, who also has the power to end the fixed term of the FOIC at their pleasure, and needs the consent and approval of the Commission on Appointments for confirmation. The FOIC has a fixed-term length of two years, under the provisions of Republic Act No. 11939, and can only be extended in times of war and national emergencies with the approval of Congress.

== List of Flag Officer-in-Command ==
The following list contains the officers who served as the Flag Officers-in-Command of the Philippine Navy.

=== Philippine Revolutionary Navy ===
No.	Portrait	Flag Officer-in-Command, Philippine Revolutionary Navy	Took office	Left office	Time in office	President	Ref.
1	Pascual V. Ledesma	Captain; Pascual V. Ledesma	May 20, 1898	July 2, 1902	4 years, 43 days	Emilio Aguinaldo	

=== Offshore Patrol ===
No.	Portrait	Flag Officer-in-Command, Offshore Patrol	Took office	Left office	Time in office	President	Ref.
(1)	Rafael Ramos (as Commander, Offshore Patrol)	Major; Rafael Ramos (as Commander, Offshore Patrol)	April 15, 1938	June 18, 1938	64 days	Manuel Quezon	
(2)	Jose V. Andrada	Captain; Jose V. Andrada	June 18, 1938	December 4, 1941	3 years, 169 days	Sergio Osmeña	
2	Enrique L. Jurado (as Flag Officer-in-Command, Offshore Patrol)	Captain; Enrique L. Jurado (as Flag Officer-in-Command, Offshore Patrol) (born 1911)	December 4, 1941	October 14, 1944	2 years, 315 days	Manuel Quezon; Sergio Osmeña	
(2)	Jose V. Andrada	Captain; Jose V. Andrada	October 14, 1944	January 2, 1948	3 years, 80 days	Sergio Osmeña; Manuel Roxas	

=== Philippine Navy ===
No.	Portrait	Flag Officer-in-Command, Philippine Navy	Took office	Left office	Time in office	President	Ref.
3	Jose V. Andrada	Commodore; Jose V. Andrada	January 2, 1948	August 28, 1949	1 year, 207 days	Manuel Roxas; Elpidio Quirino	
4	Jose V. Francisco	Commodore; Jose V. Francisco	August 28, 1949	December 23, 1961	12 years, 148 days	Elpidio Quirino; Ramon Magsaysay; Carlos P. Garcia	
5	Simeon B. Castro	Commodore; Simeon B. Castro	December 23, 1961	September 3, 1962	254 days	Carlos P. Garcia; Diosdado Macapagal	
6	Juan B. Magluyan	Commodore; Juan B. Magluyan	September 3, 1962	June 1, 1964	1 year, 272 days	Diosdado Macapagal	
7	Santiago C. Nuval	Commodore; Santiago C. Nuval	June 1, 1964	September 2, 1965	1 year, 93 days	Diosdado Macapagal	
8	Felix M. Apolinario	Commodore; Felix M. Apolinario	September 2, 1965	June 15, 1966	286 days	Diosdado Macapagal; Ferdinand Marcos	
9	Heracleo J. Alano	Commodore; Heracleo J. Alano	June 15, 1966	August 17, 1967	1 year, 63 days	Ferdinand Marcos	
10	Pastor G. Viado	Commodore; Pastor G. Viado	August 17, 1967	May 29, 1968	286 days	Ferdinand Marcos	
11	Ismael C. Lomibao	Commodore; Ismael C. Lomibao	May 29, 1968	April 2, 1970	1 year, 308 days	Ferdinand Marcos	
12	Dioscoro E. Papa	Commodore; Dioscoro E. Papa	April 2, 1970	January 15, 1972	1 year, 288 days	Ferdinand Marcos	
13	Hilario M. Ruiz	Rear Admiral; Hilario M. Ruiz	January 15, 1972	March 28, 1976	4 years, 73 days	Ferdinand Marcos	
14	Ernesto R. Ogbinar	Rear Admiral; Ernesto R. Ogbinar	March 28, 1976	August 3, 1980	4 years, 128 days	Ferdinand Marcos	
15	Simeon M. Alejandro	Rear Admiral; Simeon M. Alejandro	August 3, 1980	December 9, 1985	5 years, 128 days	Ferdinand Marcos	
16	Brillante C. Ochoco	Rear Admiral; Brillante C. Ochoco	December 9, 1985	February 26, 1986	79 days	Ferdinand Marcos; Corazon Aquino	
17	Serapio C. Martillano	Rear Admiral; Serapio C. Martillano	February 26, 1986	September 6, 1986	192 days	Corazon Aquino	
18	Tagumpay R. Jardiniano	Rear Admiral; Tagumpay R. Jardiniano	September 6, 1986	March 29, 1988	1 year, 205 days	Corazon Aquino	
19	Carlito Y. Cunanan	Rear Admiral; Carlito Y. Cunanan	March 29, 1988	March 9, 1990	1 year, 345 days	Corazon Aquino	
20	Mariano J. Dumancas	Vice Admiral; Mariano J. Dumancas	March 9, 1990	August 2, 1993	3 years, 146 days	Corazon Aquino; Fidel Ramos	
21	Virgilio Q. Marcelo	Vice Admiral; Virgilio Q. Marcelo	August 2, 1993	September 21, 1994	1 year, 50 days	Fidel Ramos	
22	Pio P. Carranza	Vice Admiral; Pio P. Carranza	September 21, 1994	November 18, 1996	2 years, 58 days	Fidel Ramos	
23	Eduardo Mario R. Santos	Vice Admiral; Eduardo Mario R. Santos	November 18, 1996	January 12, 1999	2 years, 55 days	Fidel Ramos	
24	Luisito F. Fernandez	Vice Admiral; Luisito F. Fernandez	January 12, 1999	November 23, 2000	1 year, 316 days	Fidel Ramos; Joseph Estrada	
25	Guillermo G. Wong	Vice Admiral; Guillermo G. Wong	November 23, 2000	March 1, 2001	98 days	Joseph Estrada; Gloria Macapagal Arroyo	
26	Victorino S. Hingco	Vice Admiral; Victorino S. Hingco	March 1, 2001	March 6, 2003	2 years, 5 days	Gloria Macapagal Arroyo	
27	Ernesto H. De Leon	Vice Admiral; Ernesto H. De Leon	March 6, 2003	December 5, 2005	2 years, 274 days	Gloria Macapagal Arroyo	
28	Mateo M. Mayuga	Vice Admiral; Mateo M. Mayuga	December 5, 2005	December 9, 2006	1 year, 4 days	Gloria Macapagal Arroyo	
29	Rogelio I. Calunsag	Vice Admiral; Rogelio I. Calunsag	December 9, 2006	August 2, 2008	1 year, 237 days	Gloria Macapagal Arroyo	
30	Ferdinand S. Golez	Vice Admiral; Ferdinand S. Golez	August 2, 2008	May 15, 2010	1 year, 286 days	Gloria Macapagal Arroyo	
31	Danilo M. Cortez	Rear Admiral; Danilo M. Cortez	May 15, 2010	January 4, 2011	234 days	Gloria Macapagal Arroyo; Benigno Aquino III	
32	Alexander P. Pama	Vice Admiral; Alexander P. Pama	January 4, 2011	December 21, 2012	1 year, 352 days	Benigno Aquino III	
33	Jose Luis M. Alano	Vice Admiral; Jose Luis M. Alano	December 21, 2012	April 30, 2014	1 year, 130 days	Benigno Aquino III	
34	Jesus C. Millan	Vice Admiral; Jesus C. Millan	April 30, 2014	July 10, 2015	1 year, 71 days	Benigno Aquino III	
35	Caesar C. Taccad	Vice Admiral; Caesar C. Taccad	July 10, 2015	November 12, 2016	1 year, 125 days	Benigno Aquino III; Rodrigo Duterte	
36	Ronald Joseph S. Mercado	Vice Admiral; Ronald Joseph S. Mercado	November 12, 2016	December 19, 2017	1 year, 37 days	Rodrigo Duterte	
37	Robert A. Empedrad	Vice Admiral; Robert A. Empedrad	December 19, 2017	February 3, 2020	2 years, 46 days	Rodrigo Duterte	
38	Giovanni Carlo J. Bacordo	Vice Admiral; Giovanni Carlo J. Bacordo	February 3, 2020	June 8, 2021	1 year, 125 days	Rodrigo Duterte	
39	Adeluis S. Bordado	Vice Admiral; Adeluis S. Bordado	June 8, 2021	September 8, 2022	1 year, 92 days	Rodrigo Duterte; Bongbong Marcos	
–	Caesar Bernard Valencia	Rear Admiral; Caesar Bernard Valencia; Acting	September 8, 2022	November 24, 2022	77 days	Bongbong Marcos	
40	Toribio Adaci Jr.	Vice Admiral; Toribio Adaci Jr.	November 24, 2022	November 15, 2024	1 year, 357 days	Bongbong Marcos	
41	Jose Ma. Ambrosio Q. Ezpeleta	Vice Admiral; Jose Ma. Ambrosio Q. Ezpeleta	November 15, 2024	November 13, 2026	1 year, 363 days	Bongbong Marcos	
42	Alan M. Javier	Vice Admiral; Alan M. Javier	November 13, 2026	Incumbent	6 days	Bongbong Marcos	
