= Conrado Yap-class patrol craft =

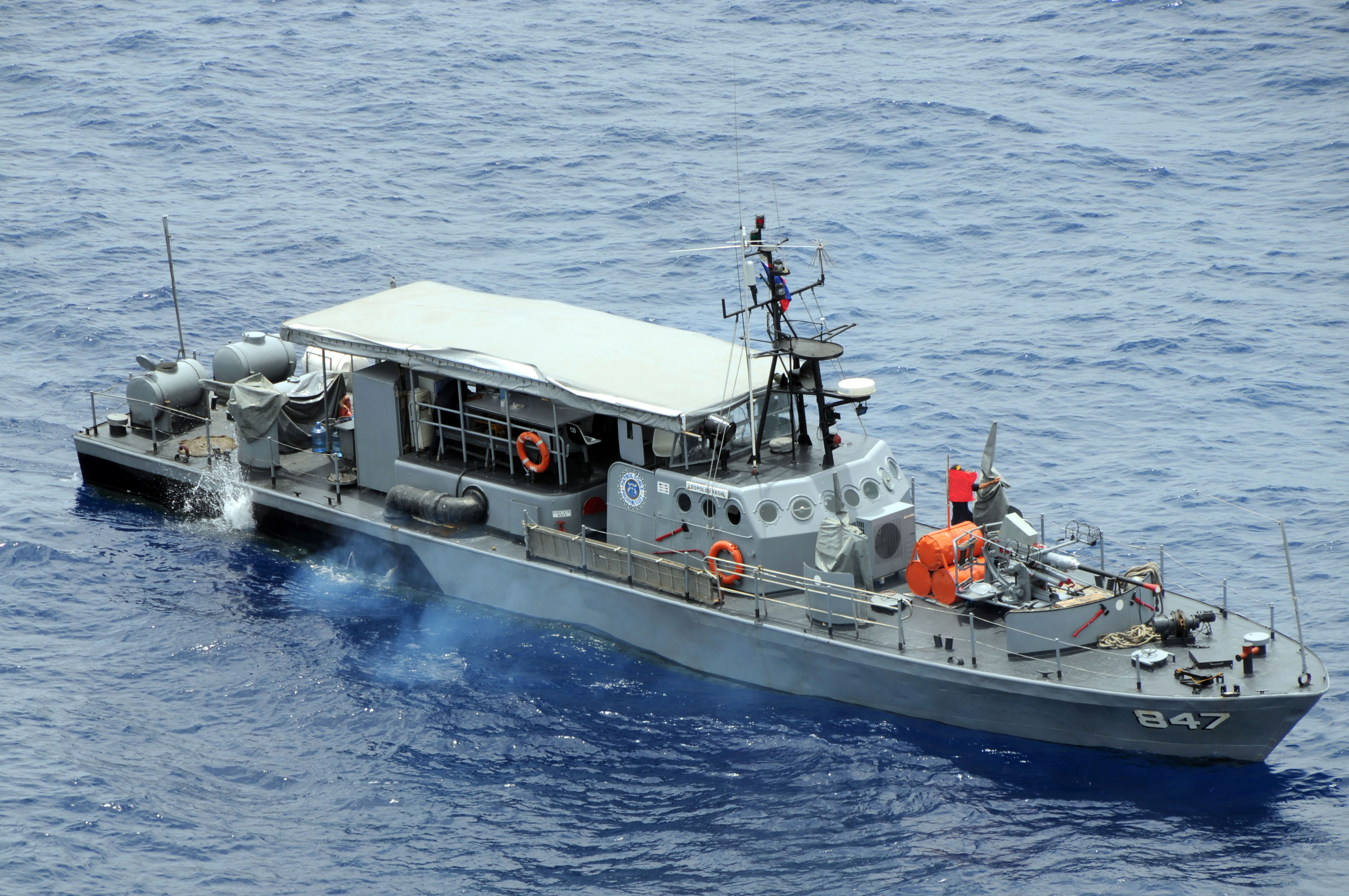
- BRP Leopoldo Regis, a Conrado Yap-class patrol boat.

Class overview
- Builders: Korea SB & Eng., Masan, and Korea Tacoma SY, Chinhae
- Operators: Philippine Navy

General characteristics
- Type: Patrol craft
- Displacement: 65.35 tons standard; 74.48 tons full load
- Length: 25.47 m (83 ft 7 in)
- Beam: 5.4 m (17 ft 9 in)
- Draught: 1.2 m (3 ft 11 in)
- Propulsion: 2 × 2,600 bhp (1,900 kW) MTU 16V538 TD 90 diesels, 2 shafts; 1 × Mitsubishi GDS 70MP auxiliary diesels, 60 kW generator
- Speed: 38 kn (70 km/h; 44 mph) maximum
- Range: 500 mi (800 km)
- Complement: 15
- Armament: 1 × Bofors 40 mm Mk 3 Mod 0 mount; 2 × Oerlikon 20 mm Mk 16 (Twin); 4 × 12.7 mm machine-guns
- Armor: Belted steel

The Conrado Yap-class was a series of ex-South Korean Haksaeng-class patrol boats sold to the Philippine Navy in 1993.

12 of these patrol boats were transferred to the Philippine Navy, and are all retired as of 2018.

== Ships in class ==
Name	Pennant	Current Status
BRP Conrado Yap	PG-840	Decommissioned
BRP Teodorico Dominado Jr.	PG-842	Decommissioned
BRP Cosme Acosta	PG-843	Decommissioned
BRP Jose Artiaga	PG-844	Decommissioned
BRP Nicanor Jimenez	PG-846	Decommissioned
BRP Leopoldo Regis	PG-847	Decommissioned
BRP Leon Tadina	PG-848	Decommissioned
BRP Loreto Danipog	PG-849	Decommissioned
BRP Apollo Tiano	PG-851	Decommissioned
BRP Sulpicio Fernandez	PG-853	Decommissioned
