= BRP Juan Magluyan =

Philippine naval vessel

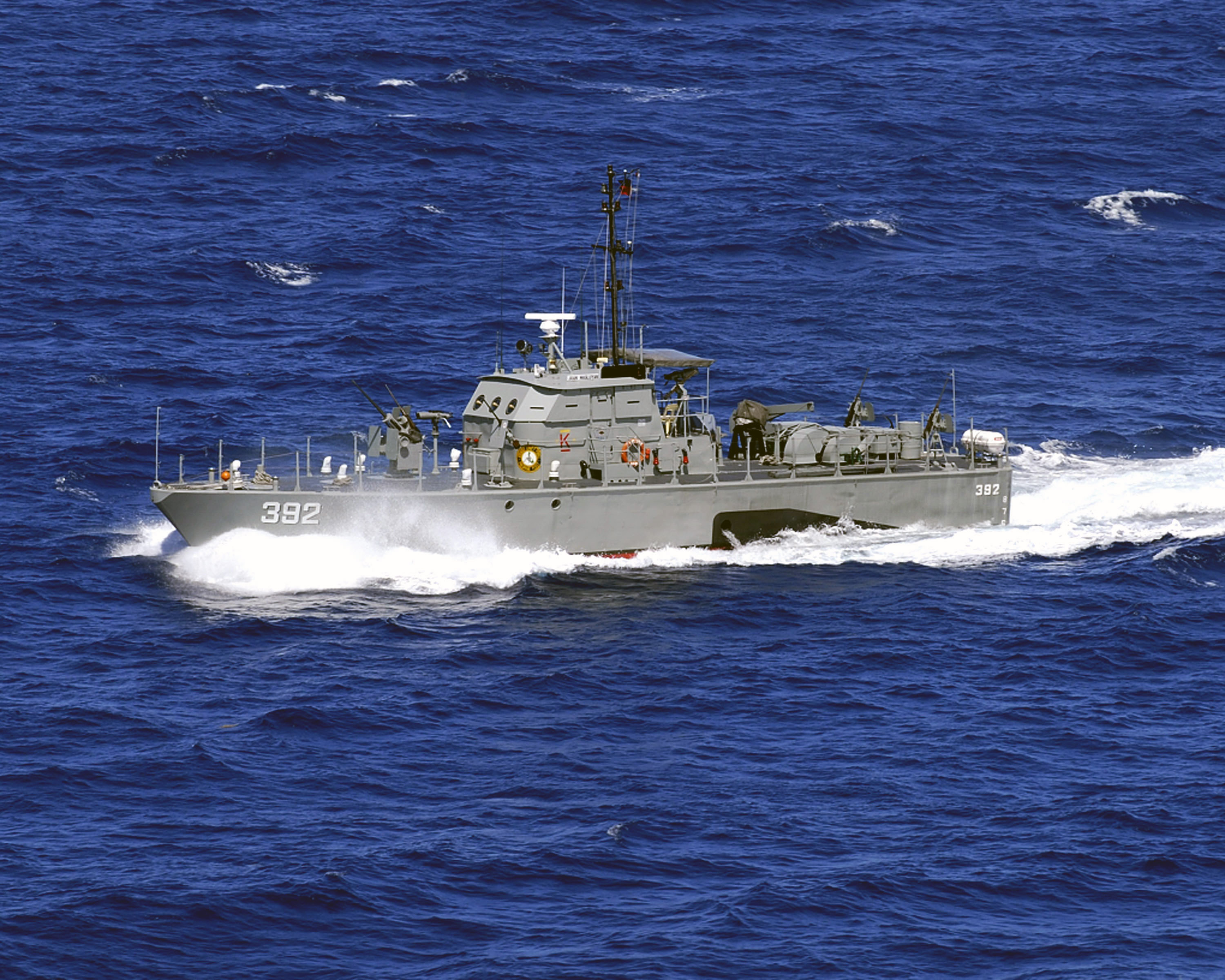
- BRP Juan Magluyan (PC-392)

History

Philippines
- Name: Juan Magluyan (PC-392)
- Namesake: Juan Magluyan was an officer of the Philippine Offshore Patrol during the Commonwealth Government period, and was the Chief of the Philippine Navy in the 1960s.
- Operator: Philippine Navy
- Ordered: 1995
- Builder: Atlantic Gulf & Pacific Co., Batangas, Philippines
- Acquired: 1998
- Commissioned: July 1998
- Reclassified: April 2016: From PG-392 to PC-392
- Status: in active service

General characteristics
- Class & type: Jose Andrada-class coastal patrol craft
- Displacement: 56.4 tons full load
- Length: 78 ft (24 m)
- Beam: 20 ft (6.1 m)
- Draft: 5.8 ft (1.8 m)
- Installed power: 2,800 hp (2,100 kW)
- Propulsion: 2 × Detroit 16V-92TA Diesel Engines; 2 × 35-kW Diesel generators; 2 shafts
- Speed: 28 knots (52 km/h) maximum
- Range: 1,200 nmi (2,200 km) at 12 knots (22 km/h)
- Boats & landing craft carried: 4-meter rigid inflatable boat at aft
- Complement: 12
- Sensors & processing systems: Raytheon AN/SPS-64(V)2 I-band Navigation / Surface Search Radar
- Armament: 1 × Bushmaster 25mm 75-cal. Mk 38 Mod 0 cannon; 4 × 50-cal. 12.7 mm GP machine guns; 2 × 7.62 mm M60 GP machine guns

BRP Juan Magluyan (PC-392) is the twentieth ship of the Jose Andrada-class coastal patrol boats of the Philippine Navy. It is part of the third batch of its class ordered in 1995, and was commissioned with the Philippine Navy in July 1998. She is currently assigned with Naval Forces West in Puerto Princesa, Palawan.

She was funded using FMS credits by the United States government. As part of the third batch ordered for the same class, she was built by the Philippine partner of the Trinity-Equitable Ship Yard of New Orleans, the Batangas-based Atlantic Gulf & Pacific Co. Shipyard. She also appears to have a bulletproof covering over the pilothouse windows.

The ship spent time in dry dock at Colorado Shipyard in Cebu in 2005.

== Technical details ==
The ship was built to United States Coast Guard standards with aluminum hull and superstructure. She is powered by two Detroit Diesel 16V-92TA Diesel Engines with a combined power of around 2,800 hp driving two propellers for a maximum speed of 28 knots (52 km/h). Maximum range is 1,200 nmi (2,200 km) at 12 knots (22 km/h), or alternatively 600 nmi (1,100 km) at 24 knots (44 km/h).

The ship was originally designed to carry one bow Mk.3 40 mm gun, one 81 mm mortar aft, and four 12.7 mm/50 caliber machine guns. Instead, she is armed with only four M2HB Browning 12.7 mm/50 caliber machine guns on Mk.26 mounts, with two positioned forward and two aft; and two M60 7.62 mm/30 caliber machine guns, both mounted amidships. The ship can carry 4,000 rounds of 12.7 mm and 2,000 rounds of 7.62 mm. A large "Big Eyes" binocular is also carried on tripod mounts, one on the forecastle and one just above the mast.

As part of the first batch (PG-370 to PG-378), it is not equipped with Mk.38 Mod.0 M242 Bushmaster 25mm chain gun that her other sister ships carry. (Note: Sources vary on weapons mount of this ship, with most indicating the presence of a Bushmaster 25mm chain gun on a Mk.38 mount. Recent photos does not show said weapon or mount, so are other ships from the first batch (PG-370 to PG-378)) It was planned to install either a stabilized or unstabilized M242 25 mm Bushmaster chain gun on her bow after some minor modifications, but as of to date has not materialized.

She is equipped with a Raytheon AN/SPS-64(V)11 surface search and navigation radar but with a smaller antenna as those used in bigger Philippine Navy ships.

A 4-meter rigid inflatable boat powered by a 40-hp outboard motor is stowed amidships.

== Operations ==
Upon the conception of Task Force Stingray in 2005, which patrols the Guimaras Strait and the Visayan Sea to guard Boracay island, BRP Juan Magluyan was one of the original ships included in the task force.

BRP Juan Magluyan, together with other Philippine Navy ships, joined the Essex Expeditionary Strike Group of the United States Navy during Balikatan 2008 exercises.

On 28 September 2009, BRP Juan Magluyan brought 20 rescued fishermen from Balabac to Puerto Princesa, Palawan for further medical treatment.

Joint elements of 62nd Marine Company of Philippine Marine Ready Force – Sulu, responded to the reports received from Joint Task Force Sulu on the sightings of Abu Sayyaf bandits in the area. The Navy ship, BRP Juan Magluyan (PC 392) and BRP Waray (LC288) which serves as Command and Control Platform also proceeded to the encounter site with the Special Operations Platoon1 of Marine Battalion Landing Team 1 for reinforcement. Fleet-Marine Troops neutralized seven members of the Abu Sayyaf Group during an encounter at Minis Island, Patikul, Sulu, early morning of 13 December 2018.
