= BRP Bonny Serrano =

History

South Korea
- Name: PKM-226
- Builder: Korea Tacoma Shipyard, Chinhae, South Korea
- Launched: 1970s
- Fate: transferred to Philippine Navy in 1995

History

Philippines
- Name: BRP Bonny Serrano (PC-111)
- Operator: Philippine Navy
- Acquired: 15 June 1995
- Commissioned: 22 May 1996
- Decommissioned: 17 December 2020
- Reclassified: April 2016 from PG-111 to PC-111
- Fate: Sunk as target in 2022

General characteristics
- Class & type: Tomas Batilo class (Chamsuri Wildcat PKM class)
- Type: Fast Attack Craft
- Displacement: 148 tons full load
- Length: 121.4 ft (37 m)
- Beam: 22.6 ft (7 m)
- Draft: 5.6 ft (1.7 m)
- Propulsion: 2 × Caterpillar 3516C diesel engines (from 2008) @ 6,300 hp, 2 shafts
- Speed: 33 knots (61 km/h) max
- Range: 600 nautical miles (1,100 km) at 20 knots
- Boats & landing craft carried: 1 × Rigid Hull Inflatable Boat
- Complement: 31
- Sensors & processing systems: Koden Electronics MDC 1500 series navigation and surface search radar
- Armament: 1 × Bofors Mark 3 40mm/60 caliber gun; 2 × Oerlikon Mark 4 20mm/70 caliber guns; 4 × Browning M2HB .50 caliber heavy machine guns

BRP Bonny Serrano (PC-111) was a Tomas Batilo-class fast attack craft of the Philippine Navy. It is part of the first batch transferred by the South Korean government on 15 June 1995, and arrived in the Philippines in August 1995. It was commissioned with the Philippine Navy on 22 May 1996,

It was upgraded under the Patrol Killer Medium-Republic of the Philippines (PKM-RP) Program of 2006 by Propmech Corp., the program includes the reinforcement of its hull, replacing the engines, radar, navigation and communication systems, and changing the weapons fit-out to include crane and space for rubber boats. The upgrades were completed in 2008.

The ship was part of the Philippine Navy contingent during the US-Philippines CARAT 2008 sea-phase exercises.

In April 2016, in line with the Philippine Navy Standard Operating Procedures #08, the boat was reclassified as the BRP Bonny Serrano (PC-111) as a patrol craft.

The patrol craft was among the sea and air assets decommissioned and deactivated by the Philippine Navy on 17 December 2020.

== Technical Details ==
The ship was originally powered by 2 MTU MD 16V 538 TB90 diesel engines with total output of 6,000 horsepower. From 2007, Propmech was contracted to replace the old engines with new Caterpillar 3516C diesel engines with a total output of 6,300 horsepower.

The ship was equipped with a Koden Electronics MDC 1500 Series navigation and surface search radar, which replaced the previously installed radar during the refurbishing works in 2007.
