= BRP Nicolas Mahusay =

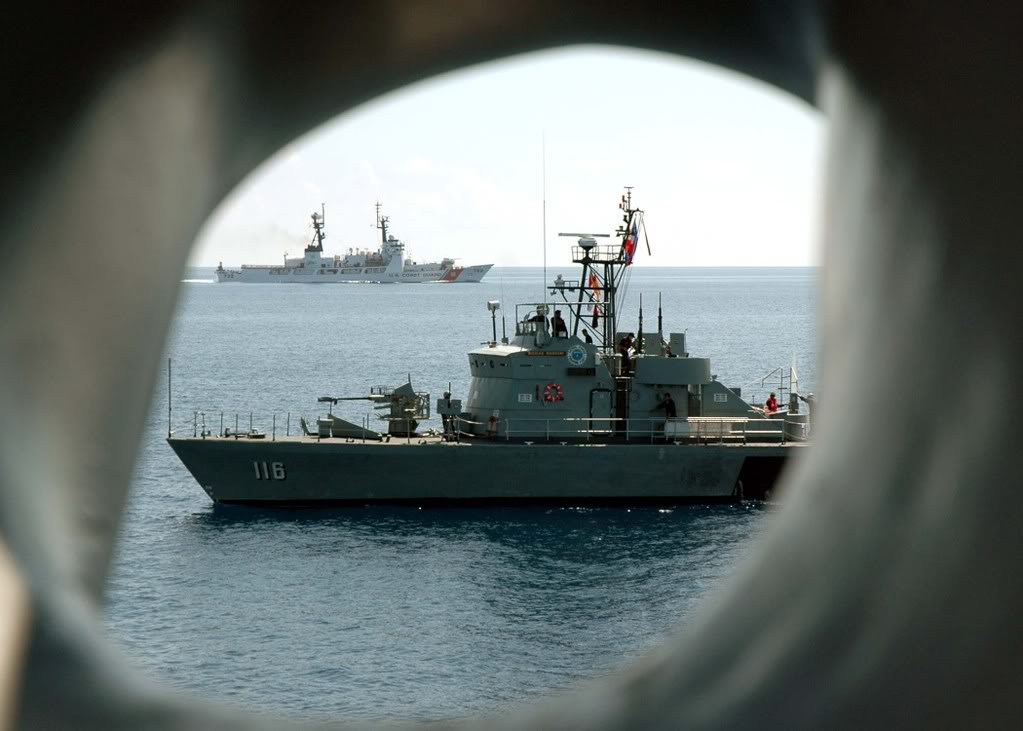
- BRP Nicolas Mahusay

History

South Korea
- Name: PKM-218
- Builder: Korea Tacoma Shipyard, Chinhae, South Korea
- Launched: 1970s
- Completed: 30 November 1978
- Commissioned: 01 November 1979
- Decommissioned: 15 June 1995
- Fate: transferred to Philippine Navy in June 1998 as spare parts hulk

History

Philippines
- Name: BRP Nicolas Mahusay (PC-116)
- Operator: Philippine Navy
- Acquired: 1998
- Commissioned: 2 July 1998
- Decommissioned: 29 January 2020
- Reclassified: April 2016, from PG-116 to PC-116, and to PC-119
- Status: Decommissioned

General characteristics
- Class & type: Tomas Batilo class (Chamsuri Wildcat PKM class)
- Type: Fast Attack Craft
- Displacement: 148 tons full load
- Length: 121.4 ft (37 m)
- Beam: 22.6 ft (7 m)
- Draft: 5.6 ft (1.7 m)
- Propulsion: 2 × Caterpillar 3516C diesel engines (from 2008) @ 6,300 hp, 2 shafts
- Speed: 33 knots (61 km/h) max
- Range: 600 nautical miles (1,100 km) at 20 knots
- Boats & landing craft carried: 1 × Rigid Hull Inflatable Boat
- Complement: 31
- Sensors & processing systems: Koden Electronics MDC 1500 series navigation and surface search radar
- Armament: 1 × Bofors 40 mm naval gun; 2 × Oerlikon 20mm guns; 4 × 50-caliber Machine Guns

BRP Nicolas Mahusay (PC-119) was a Tomas Batilo-class fast attack craft of the Philippine Navy. It was transferred by the South Korean government in 1998. It was initially acquired as a spare parts hulk, but the need for additional ships led to its commissioning with the Philippine Navy on 2 July 1998.

It was upgraded under the Patrol Killer Medium-Republic of the Philippines (PKM-RP) Program of 2006 by Propmech Corp., the program includes the reinforcement of its hull, replacing the engines, radar, navigation and communication systems, and changing the weapons fit-out to include crane and space for rigid hull inflatable boat. The upgrades were completed in 2008.

The ship received the Philippine Navy Plaque of Merit on 2009, being adjudged as the patrol gunboat of the year.

In April 2016, in line with the Philippine Navy Standard Operating Procedures #08, the boat was reclassified as the patrol craft BRP Nicolas Mahusay (PC-116), but was later renumbered to PC-119 as the Philippine Navy believed that the ship was unlucky after encountering several mishaps in its final years.

== Technical Details ==
The ship was originally powered by 2 MTU MD 16V 538 TB90 diesel engines with total output of 6,000 horsepower. From 2007, Propmech was contracted to replace the old engines with new Caterpillar 3516C diesel engines with a total output of 6,300 horsepower.

The ship was equipped with a Koden Electronics MDC 1500 Series navigation and surface search radar, which replaced the previously installed radar during the refurbishing works in 2007.
