= AFP Western Command =

Philippine Military's unified branch command for Palawan Island and West Philippine Sea

Western Command
- Active: March 28, 2001 – Present
- Country: Philippines
- Role: Conventional and Unconventional Warfare, Anti-Guerrilla Operations, Protecting the Sovereign Territory
- Part of: Under the Armed Forces of the Philippines
- Garrison/HQ: Puerto Princesa City
- Nickname: WESCOM
- Mottos: Protector of the West Philippine Sea and the Last Frontier; We Do It
- Mascot: Palawan peacock-pheasant
- Anniversaries: March 28
- Engagements: Anti-guerilla operations against the NPA, Abu Sayyaf Group and local criminal elements
- Website: www.wescom.mil.ph

Commanders
- Current commander: VADM Alan M. Javier PN

Insignia
- Unit Patch: Western Command Emblem

The Western Command (abbrv. as WESCOM) is the Armed Forces of the Philippines' combatant command in charge of the islands of Palawan and Kalayaan, including the disputed Spratly Islands group. It is responsible for the defense of these areas against external aggression, as well as combating terrorism and insurgency.

== Operations ==
- Anti-guerrilla operations against the New People's Army
- Anti-terrorist operations against known terror groups operating in their area of responsibility.
- Guarding and patrol operation on the Spratly Islands (Kalayaan Island Group).
- Defense and protection of Palawan and islands in the South China Sea (relevant areas referred to by the Philippine government as West Philippine Sea) against Chinese aggression.
- Joint Multinational Search and Rescue Operations for Malaysia Airlines Flight 370.

== Organization ==
The following are the units that are under the Western Command:

- Tactical Operations Wing West, PAF
- Western Naval Command, PN
- MBLT-3, PMC
- MBLT-4, PMC
- 18th Special Forces Company (Riverine), PA
- 3rd Marine Brigade, PMC

== See also ==
- Alberto Carlos Commander, 2022-2024
