= Sagisag ng Ulirang Kawal =

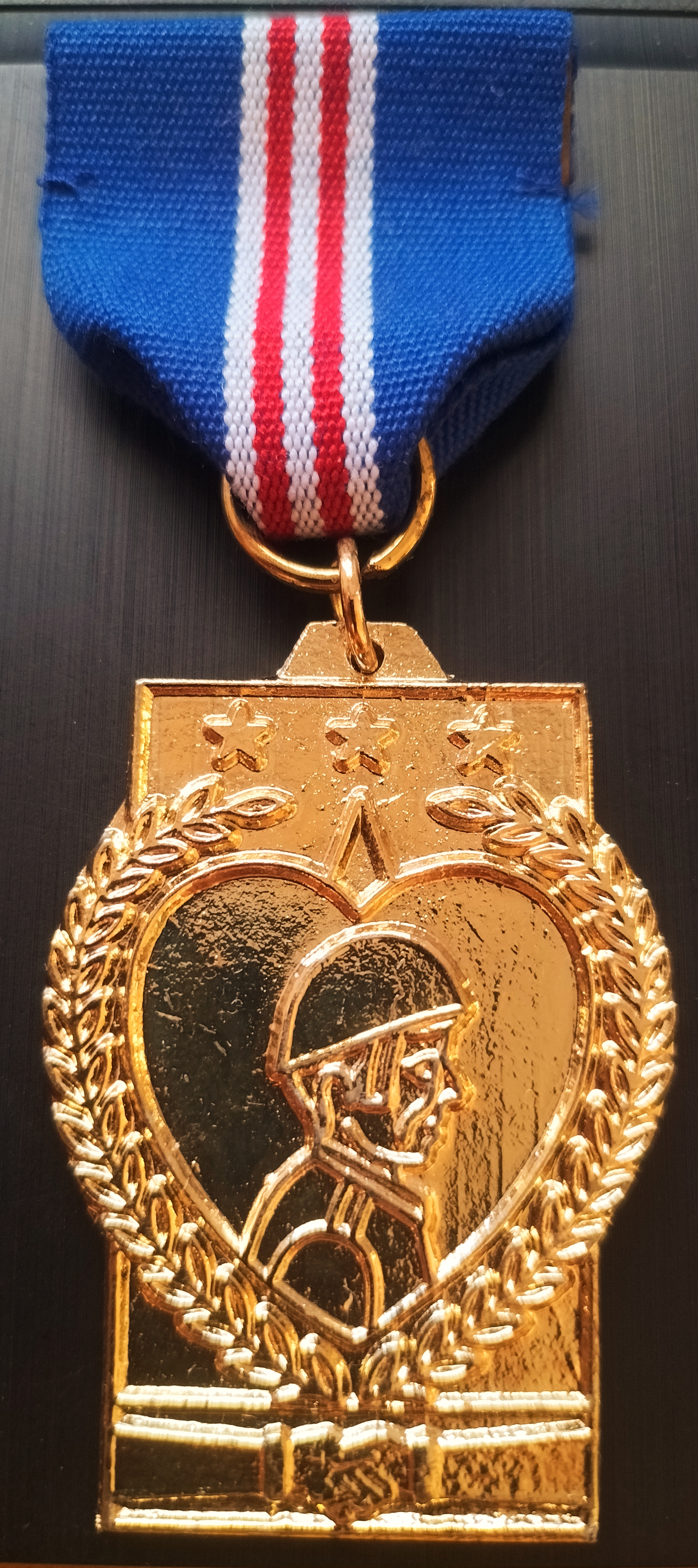
- Sagisag ng Ulirang Kawal medal
- Type: Military decoration
- Awarded for: Conspicuous performance of non-military activities and community development programs or other related activities, which merit recognition
- Country: Philippines
- Presented by: the Armed Forces of the Philippines
- Eligibility: Personnel of the Armed Forces of the Philippines
- Status: Currently Awarded
- Sagisag ng Ulirang Kawal Ribbon Bar

Precedence
- Next (higher): Military Merit Medal
- Next (lower): Military Civic Action Medal

The Sagisag ng Ulirang Kawal (SUK) (English: Symbol/Badge of an Exemplary/Model Soldier) is a military decoration of the Armed Forces of the Philippines. It is awarded to the personnel of the Armed Forces of the Philippines for conspicuous performance of non-military activities and community development programs or other related activities, which merit recognition.

== Requirements ==
Recipients of the SUK must distinguish oneself conspicuously "in the performance of non-military activities and community development programs, and other related activities which merit public recognition."

== Description ==
=== Obverse ===
The SUK is a heart-shaped medal (somewhat unique to the usual stars, crosses, and circles of the other medals awarded by the AFP) superimposed on a vertical rectangle. Inside the heart is a relief of a soldier wearing a combat helmet, facing to the right. a Sampaguita wreath wraps the entire heart. Behind the heart is a silver-plated triangle with three silver stars on top (i.e. apex). Below the heart is a pair of hands depicting a handshake gesture, wearing the sleeve of the native formal Filipino male dress, the barong Tagalog.

The reverse of the SUK is plain, reserved for the name of the recipient to be engraved.

=== Symbolism and Significance ===
Soldier - indicated that the recipient is a model soldier ("Ulirang Kawal", hence the name of the award)

Clasped hands - the effort in winning the confidence of the civilians on the trustworthiness of the military

Heart - the concern of the military in its sincere and honest effort in extending assistance to fellowmen who may be peace-loving citizens, or misguided element of society

Sampaguita wreath - the fragrance worthy of emulating to the masses

Triangle, and stars - the three major island groups of the Philippines

=== Service Ribbon ===
The SUK is suspended from a ribbon that has a deep blue base, with three white stripes in the middle, interlined with two red stripes.

=== Appurtenances ===
Every subsequent award of the SUK to an individual shall be appurtenant with an Anahaw Leaf, and is awarded as follows:

- Bronze Anahaw Leaf - for the first, second, third, and fourth succeeding award
- Silver Anahaw Leaf - for every fifth succeeding Bronze Anahaw Leaf
- Gold Anahaw Leaf - for every fifth Silver Anahaw Leaf

These devices are to be worn on the SUK's ribbon bar in dress uniforms, with the tips of the leaf pointed upward.

== See also ==
- Awards and decorations of the Armed Forces of the Philippines
