= USLHT Anemone =

American lighthouse and buoy tender

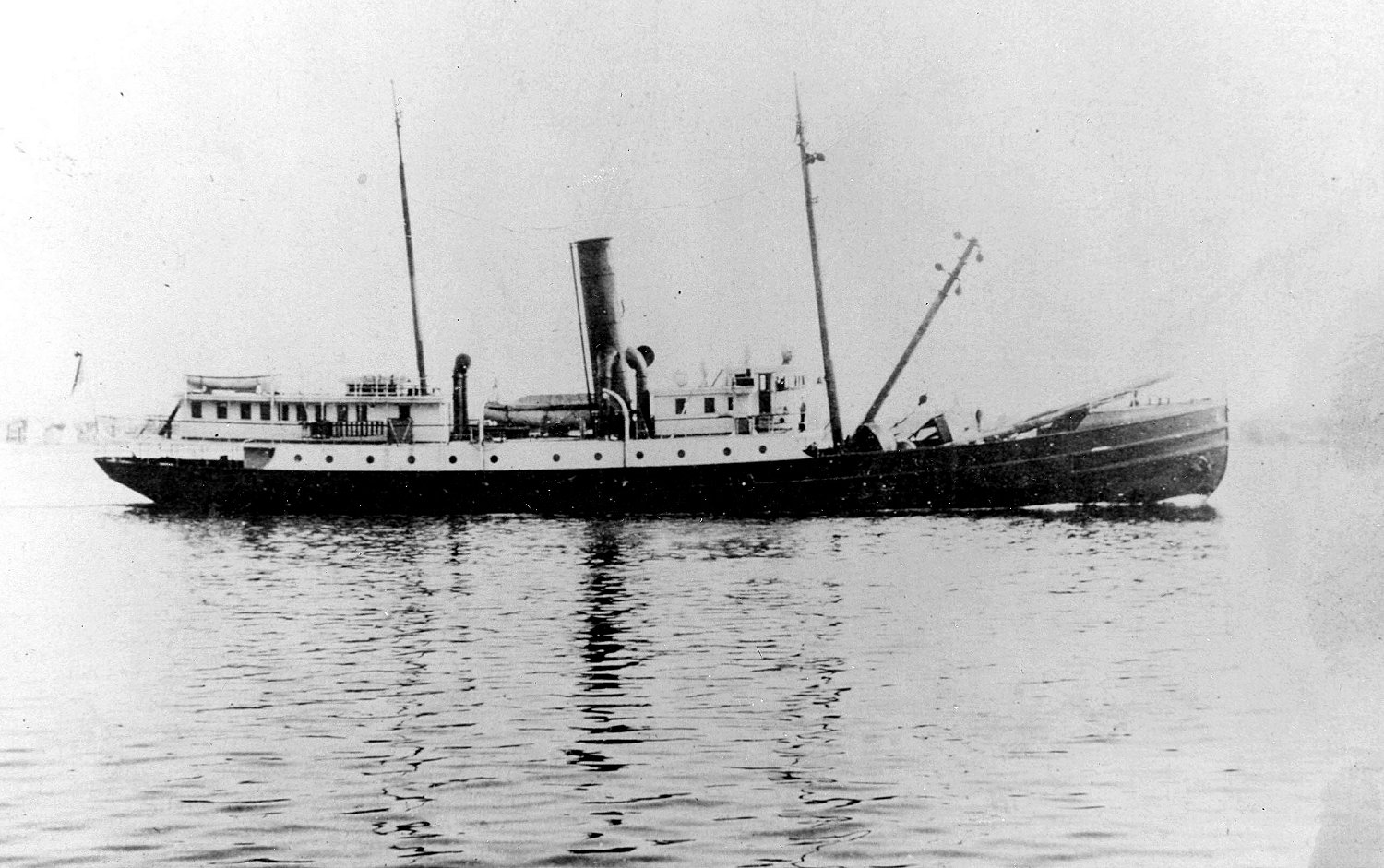

History

United States
- Name: USLHT Anemone (1908–1917; 1919–1939); USS Anemone (1917–1919); USCGC Anemone (1939–1946)
- Operator: United States Lighthouse Service (1908–1917; 1919–1939); United States Navy (1917–1919); United States Coast Guard (1939–1946)
- Builder: New York Shipbuilding Company
- Launched: 13 June 1908
- Commissioned: 25 July 1908
- Identification: Call sign: GVRH, 1909; WWCD, 1933; NRWC, 1939
- Fate: Transferred to the Philippines

Philippines
- Name: Anemone
- Operator: Philippine Naval Patrol
- Acquired: 1947
- Fate: unknown

General characteristics
- Class & type: Manzanita-class tender
- Length: 190 feet (58 m)
- Beam: 30 feet (9.1 m)
- Depth: 13.25 feet (4.04 m)
- Installed power: 2 x triple-expansion steam engines, 1,100 SHP
- Propulsion: 2 propellers
- Speed: 12 knots (14 mph; 22 km/h)

USLHT Anemome was a steel-hulled lighthouse tender built for the United States Lighthouse Service in 1908. She was one of the eight Manzanita-class tenders. Throughout her career in U.S. government service she supplied lightships and lighthouses, and maintained buoys and other navigational aids in her area. She was initially based in Detroit, but after 1910 was assigned to Woods Hole, Massachusetts.

While her work was consistent throughout her career, Anemone was directed by a number of different U.S. government organizations. During World War I, she was commissioned in the U.S. Navy, before being returned to the Lighthouse Service in 1919. In 1939 the Lighthouse Service was abolished, and Anemone became part of the U.S. Coast Guard. The Coast Guard was placed under Navy control in World War II, and Anemone was armed. In the demobilization which followed the end of the war, Anemone was transferred to the government of the Philippines along with three other Manzanita-class tenders.

Anemone was refit to carry important political figures among the islands of the Philippines, and indeed the first two presidents of the country cruised aboard her. She also delivered relief supplies to areas affected by natural disasters. Her final disposition is unknown.

== Construction and characteristics ==
Anemone was originally conceived by the Lighthouse Board as a second tender for the inspector of the 11th Lighthouse District, who was responsible for maintaining aids to navigation on Lake Superior and Lake Huron. The growth in the number of buoys and lighthouses in the district exceeded the capacity of USLHT Marigold, the only tender in the district.

Construction was funded by two Congressional appropriations, one for $50,000 approved on 28 April 1904, and a second for $90,000 approved on 3 March 1905. According to newspaper reports at the time, this funding was pushed through Congress by local Duluth and Superior shipping interests and the associated Minnesota and Wisconsin congressional delegations. Proposals for a single-screw Anemone were solicited in June 1906. When the bids were opened in July 1906, they were rejected, as they all exceeded the $140,000 authorized for the tender. The Lighthouse Board then packaged Anemone with other acquisition programs and solicited proposals for eight new lighthouse tenders in March 1907. On 1 May 1907 sealed bids were opened in Washington, D.C. Four companies bid for the contract. New York Shipbuilding Company of Camden, New Jersey was the lowest at $164,000 for each of the eight ships. This bid was accepted. The eight ships produced under this contract became known as the Manzanita class.

Anemone was built of steel plates riveted together. She was 190 feet (58 m) long, with a beam of 30 feet (9.1 m), and a depth of hold of 16 feet (4.9 m). The ship's loaded draft was 13 feet (4.0 m). Her light displacement was 803 tons, and her full-load displacement was 1,053 tons.

She had two bronze propellers which were 7.5 feet (2.3 m) in diameter. These were driven by two triple-expansion steam engines. Their high-pressure cylinders had a diameter of 12 inches, the intermediate pressure cylinders 19 inches, and the low pressure cylinders 32 inches, with a common stroke of 24 inches. Steam was provided by two coal-fired Scotch marine boilers that burned coal. The engines were each capable of producing 550 shaft horsepower and drove the ship at 12.5 knots.

She was assigned the signal letters GVRH in 1909. In 1933 this was changed to WWCD. When Anemone was commissioned into the Coast Guard, her call sign changed again, this time to NRWC. She had a wireless telegraphy station aboard by 1919 with the call sign NABP, which was changed in 1924 to WWCD. In 1923 the ship had radio direction finding equipment, or "radio compass" equipment installed.

Anemone's keel was laid on 12 November 1907, she was launched on 13 June 1908, and was delivered to the Lighthouse Service on 25 July 1908. The Lighthouse Service calculated her original cost at $191,999.

In 1920 the tender was manned by 7 officers and 26 crewmen.

== U.S. Government service (1908–1946) ==
=== U.S. Lighthouse Service (1908–1917) ===
Anemone arrived in Detroit to begin her work with the 11th Lighthouse District on 28 August 1908. Her primary missions were to maintain buoys, tow lightships to and from their stations, and to supply remote lighthouses and lightships. As the Great Lakes froze every winter, Anemone had to remove all the buoys in the fall lest they be damaged or sunk by ice, and replace them in the spring.

At the end of the ice-free navigation season on the Great Lakes in 1910, Anemone was transferred to the 2nd Lighthouse District. She arrived in October 1910. She replaced USLHT Azalea at Woods Hole, Massachusetts. In this new assignment, she maintained aids to navigation, and delivered supplies to lighthouses and lightships in Vineyard Sound and around Nantucket. She was also used for light ice-breaking to free ships that had been frozen in.

Like many government ships, Anemone had a history of aiding vessels in distress. On 11 December 1914 Anemone towed the disabled schooner Grace Darling safely to port. In 1915 she towed the disabled four-masted schooner Geroge F. Scannell to port.

=== U.S. Navy (1917–1919) ===
On 11 April 1917 President Wilson issued Executive Order 2588 transferring a number of lighthouse tenders to support the American military effort in World War I. Wilson's order originally transferred Anemone to the War Department, but within a matter of days her assignment was changed to the Navy. She was transferred to the Navy on 16 April 1917, and commissioned as USS Anemone, the second U.S. naval vessel of that name, on 16 May 1917. She was assigned to the 2nd Naval District.

Anemone continued her assistance to disabled ships while part of the Navy. In 1918 she assisted the minesweeper USS Whitecap off the rocks on which she had grounded. On 21 June 1919 the tender pulled the passenger steamer Northland off the rocks at West Island Ledge in Massachusetts.

After the war, on 1 July 1919, the components of the Lighthouse Service which had become part of the Navy were returned to the supervision of the Department of Commerce. Anemone was struck from the Navy list on 4 March 1919.

=== U.S. Lighthouse Service (1919–1939) ===
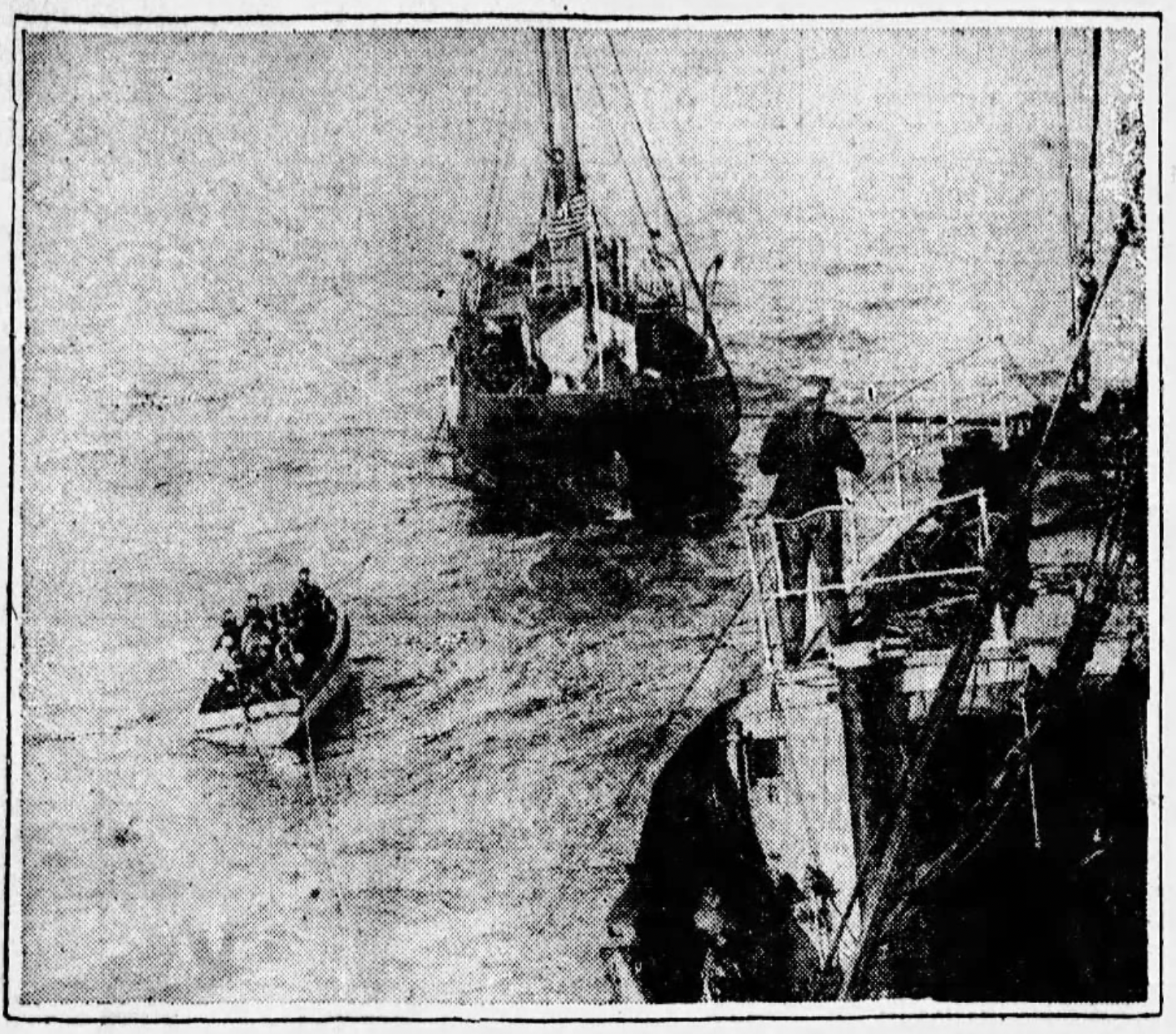
Survivors of Seaconnet sinking are transferred to Anemone (foreground) from the Vineyard Sound Lightship in 1923

Once returned to the Lighthouse Service, Anemone returned to her pre-war duties of maintaining buoys, lighthouses, and lightships from her base at Woods Hole. Her service to lightships included delivering food, fuel, water, mail, personnel, and other supplies, as well as towing them between their stations and port. Due to stormy winter weather, it was common for a lightship's anchor chain to break. The lightship would then float off and have to be rescued. In December 1920, for example, Anemone found the Nantucket Shoals lightship, which had drifted 27.5 miles (44.3 km) from its station before she could be towed back.

In 1922 the ship towed the tug Augustus, whose boilers had been disabled, safely back to port. On 30 April 1923, the surviving crew of the sunken collier Seaconnet were transferred from the Vineyard Sound Lightship to Anemone, which took them ashore. In 1925 the tender towed the disabled four-masted schooner A. F. Davison into Vineyard Haven. In October 1930 Anemone and a Coast Guard partrol boat pulled the freighter Katrina Luckenbach off the rocks in Vineyard Sound where she had grounded. In 1939 the ship pulled the 6,000-ton freighter El Oceano off the sand where she grounded leaving Boston.

Anemone's boilers were replaced in 1932 with new coal-burning water-tube boilers, at a cost of $22,600. On 19 October 1933 the Public Works Administration allotted $153,532 to the Lighthouse Service primarily to repair storm damage to Atlantic Coast lightships and lighthouses. A portion of these funds were used to convert Anemone's boilers from coal-burning to oil-burning. The conversion was completed in September 1934.

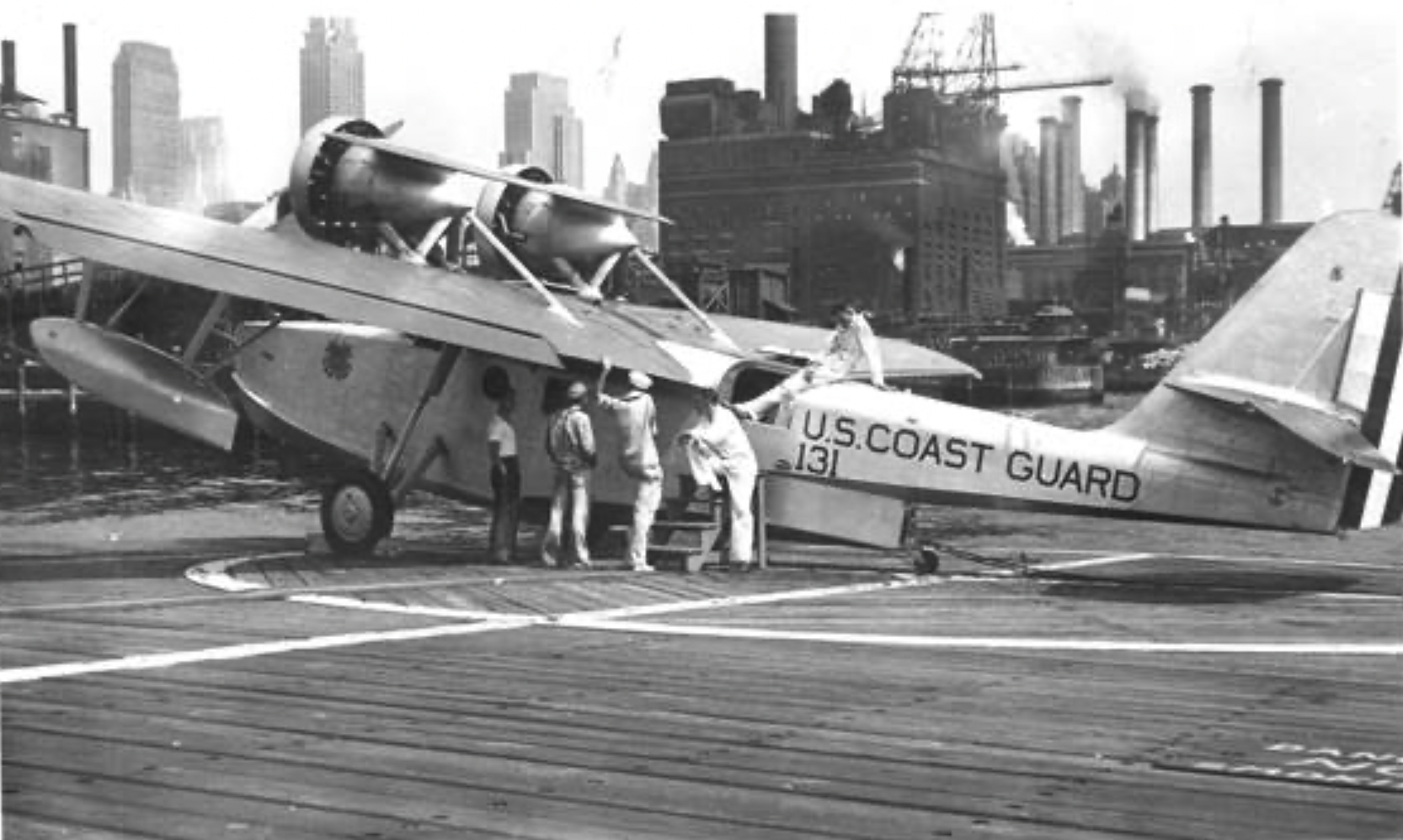
Anemone recovered the wreck of Coast Guard 131 in 1935

In the 1930s, the Coast Guard began using amphibious aircraft for search and rescue missions. A crewman on the Pollock Rip Lightship became ill in September 1935, and a Coast Guard Douglas Dolphin RD-4, number 131, was dispatched to evacuate him to medical facilities on shore. The plane crashed and sank in heavy seas. Anemone participated in the recovery of the wreck and transported it to Boston.

=== U.S. Coast Guard (1939-1946) ===
By order of President Franklin Roosevelt, the Coast Guard absorbed the U.S. Lighthouse Service on 1 July 1939. Anemone was commissioned as USCGC Anemone, and given the pennant number WAGL-202. She continued to maintain buoys and lightships, based out of Woods Hole. While her job did not change, the employment conditions for her crew did. They went from civilian employees to personnel of the Coast Guard. A sign of heightening tensions in the Atlantic, Anemone was repainted in Navy gray in September 1941.

On 1 November 1941 President Roosevelt signed Executive Order 8929 transferring the Coast Guard from Treasury Department control to Navy Department control. Anemone remained at Woods Hole and continued her work maintaining aids to navigation, but now part of the 1st Naval District. She performed a number of assignments for the Navy including tending anti-submarine nets, handling heavy moorings for Navy ships, and assisting in the development of experimental mine fields. During the war she was armed with a 3"/23-caliber gun, two 20mm guns, and two depth charge racks.

Anemone was decommissioned on 1 July 1946 and transferred to the Philippine government.

== Philippine service (1947–?) ==
Four Manzanita class ships were transferred to the Philippines, USCGC Anemone, USCGC Orchid, USCGC Sequoia, and USCGC Tulip. Both Anemone and Orchid were refit to carry important political figures among the country's many islands, with Orchid named as the official presidential yacht. In March 1947 Philippines President Manual A. Roxas was aboard Anemone for a tour of Southeastern Luzon and Mindoro. Vice-President Elpidio Quirino was aboard Anemone touring the central Philippines in April 1948 when he got word of Roxas' death, and his own acension to the presidency. He traveled back to Manila on Anemone.

Typhoon Jean made landfall in the Philippines just after Christmas 1947. Anemone carried relief supplies to South Luzon and Masbate Islands.

In September 1948, Anemone assisted refugees from the eruption of Mount Hibok-Hibok on Camiguin Island in the Philippines.

Her final disposition is unknown.
