= Anemone (disambiguation) =

Anemone is a genus of flowering plants in the buttercup family Ranunculaceae.

Anemone may also refer to:

== Biology ==
- Wood anemone, a common name for various flowering plants in genus Anemonoides
- Rue anemone, a common name for Thalictrum thalictroides, a flowering plant in the buttercup family Ranunculaceae
- Sea anemone, a type of marine invertebrate
- Tube-dwelling anemone, another type of marine invertebrate
- Hippolytidae, anemone shrimp

== Music ==
- "Anemone", a song by the Brian Jonestown Massacre on their album Their Satanic Majesties' Second Request
- "Anemone", a song by L'Arc-en-Ciel on their album Clicked Singles Best 13
- "Anemone", a song by ClariS
- "Anemone", a song by Band-Maid on their album World Domination
- "Anemone", a song by Joywave
- Anemone (band), from Montréal, Quebec
- "anemone", a song by slenderbodies

== Other uses ==
- Anemone, a French radar used in the Super Etendard Modernise and the Dassault-Breguet/Dornier Alpha jet
- Anemone (Eureka Seven), one of the characters in the anime series Eureka Seven
- Anémone (1950–2019), a French actress
- Anemone, a 2025 film starring Daniel Day-Lewis
- Anémone Marmottan (born 1988), French World Cup alpine ski racer
- USS Anemone, the name of more than one US Navy ship
  - USS Anemone (1864), a steamer used by the Union Navy during the American Civil War
  - USS Anemone IV (SP-1290), a US Navy patrol vessel in service from 1917 to 1919

== See also ==
- Anemonoides, a genus of "anemone-like" flowering plants
- Anemonastrum, a genus of flowering plants that are "somewhat like anemone"
