= USS Anemone =

USS Anemone may refer to the following ships of the United States Navy:

- USS Anemone (1864), a steamer in commission from 1864 to 1865
- USS Anemone (1908), a patrol vessel and minelayer in commission from 1917 to 1919

== See also ==
- USS Anemone IV (SP-1290), a patrol vessel in service from 1917 to 1919
