= Manzanita (disambiguation) =

Manzanita is a North American shrub, common name for many species of the genus Arctostaphylos.

Manzanita may also refer to:

- Crataegus mexicana (Mexican hawthorn), known in Spanish as manzanita or tejocote
- Malvaviscus arboreus (wax mallow, Turk's cap), known in Mexico as manzanita and manzanita de pollo
- Muntingia calabura (Jamaica cherry), known in the Philippines and Guam as manzanita or mansanita
- Ziziphus jujuba and Ziziphus mauritiana (Jujube), known in the Philippines as manzanita or mansanita

== Geography ==
- Manzanita, San Diego County, California, an unincorporated community
- Manzanita, Oregon, a town
- Manzanita, Bainbridge Island, Washington
- Manzanita Village, a residence hall at University of California, Santa Barbara

== Music ==
- Manzanita (singer), Spanish singer
- Manzanita (Mia Doi Todd album), 2005
- Manzanita (Tony Rice album), 1979
- Manzanita (Shana Cleveland album), 2023
- Manzanita y su Conjunto, Peruvian band

== Other ==
- Manzanita, Manzana verde, an alcoholic beverage
- Manzanita-class tenders, a class of 190-foot long United States Lighthouse Service tenders
  - USLHT Manzanita, the lead ship of the class
