= BRP Ang Pangulo =

Presidential yacht acquired by the Philippine government

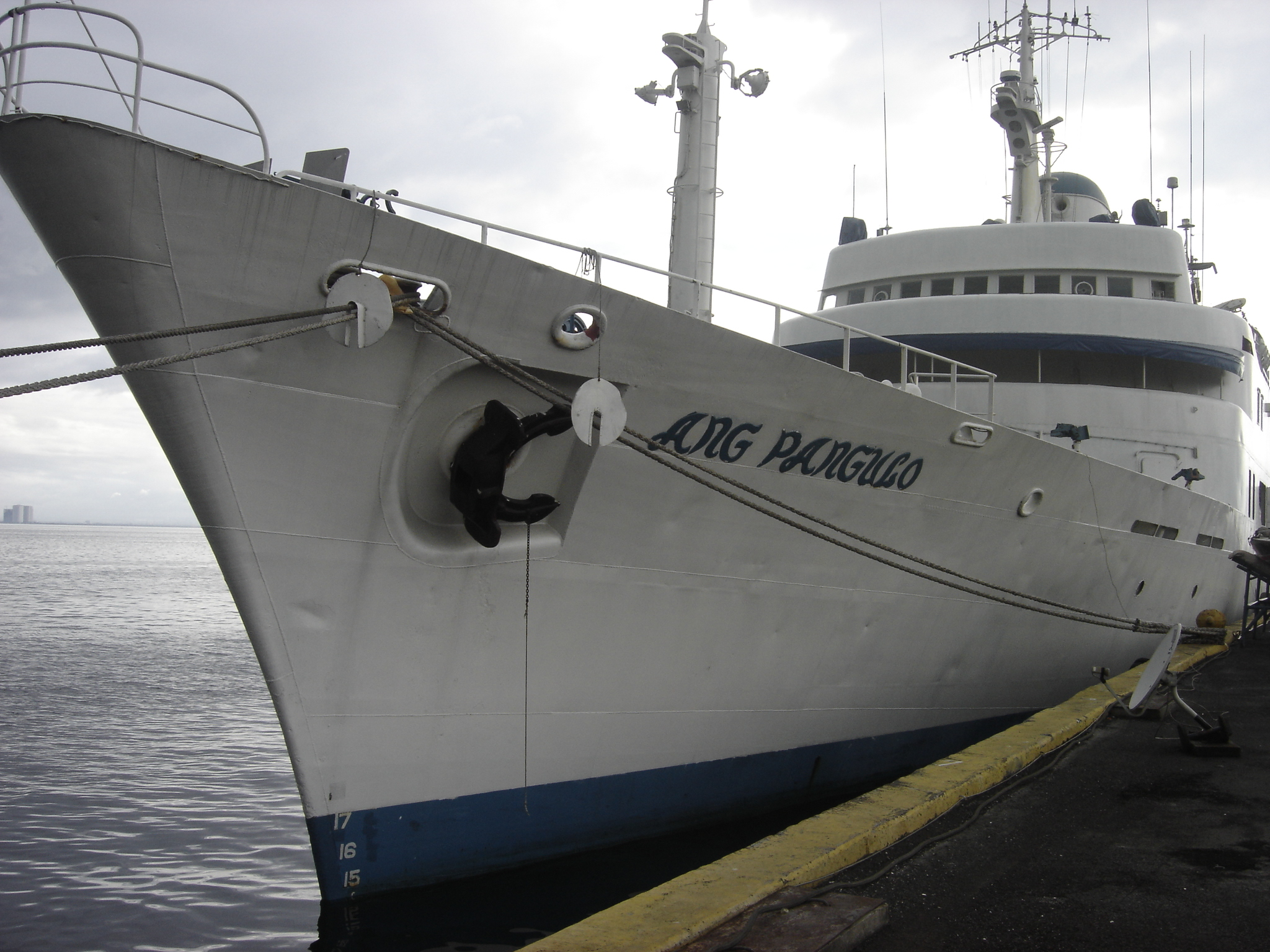

History

Philippines
- Name: Ang Pangulo
- Namesake: Filipino for "The President"
- Operator: Philippine Navy
- Builder: Ishikawajima-Harima Heavy Industries
- Cost: US$3,000,000
- Laid down: July 16, 1958
- Launched: October 16, 1958
- Commissioned: March 7, 1959
- Renamed: RPS Lapu-Lapu (PY-77) in 1960; RPS Roxas; RPS The President; BRP Pag-Asa (AT-25) in 2009
- Status: in active service
- Badge

General characteristics
- Class & type: Ang Pangulo class
- Type: Presidential yacht
- Displacement: 2,200 Tons (Full Load)
- Length: 254 ft (77 m)
- Beam: 42.7 ft (13.0 m) (folded)
- Draft: 19.5 ft (5.9 m)
- Installed power: 5,000 hp (3,700 kW)
- Propulsion: 2 × Mitsui-Burmeister & Wain DE642/VBF75
- Speed: 18 knots (33 km/h; 21 mph) (maximum), 15 knots (sustained)
- Range: 6,900 nmi (12,800 km; 7,900 mi) at 15 knots (28 km/h; 17 mph)
- Capacity: 44 yacht guests
- Crew: 81 crew members
- Aviation facilities: Helipad at aft deck

BRP Ang Pangulo (AT-25) (ex-hull classifications PY-77, TP-71, and TP-777) is a presidential yacht operated by the Philippine Navy. Acquired by the Philippine government in 1959 as part of post-World War II war reparations from Japan, the vessel was customized by Filipino naval engineers and first utilized by President Carlos P. Garcia as the navy's flagship under the name RPS Lapu-Lapu.

Throughout its service history, the ship's designation and name shifted alongside the priorities of subsequent political administrations. It was converted into a naval troop transport called RPS Roxas by President Diosdado Macapagal, reinstated to presidential yacht service as RPS The President and later BRP Ang Pangulo by Ferdinand Marcos Sr., and renamed BRP Pag-Asa under the administration of Gloria Macapagal Arroyo. The ship's historical name was officially restored by President Benigno Aquino III in 2011.

In addition to fulfilling its primary ceremonial and command duties for the President of the Philippines, the vessel serves an active dual role as an auxiliary deployment asset. In recent decades, it has been heavily utilized by the Armed Forces of the Philippines for civil-military operations, including disaster relief, emergency search and rescue, and deployment as a floating quarantine facility and hospital ship during national emergencies.

== Design and construction ==
BRP Ang Pangulo was built in Japan by Ishikawajima-Harima Heavy Industries at the Harumi Yard in Tokyo. The vessel was ordered as part of Japan's post-World War II war reparations to the Republic of the Philippines during the administration of President Carlos P. Garcia. Originally designated as "Bow No. 77", the ship was customized by Filipino naval engineers to serve specifically as the presidential yacht.

The ship's keel was laid down on July 16, 1958, and it was launched on October 16 of the same year. Sea trials were conducted on February 9 and 10, 1959, under the supervision of Lieutenant Commander Manuel Mandapat, the vessel's first commanding officer. The ship has an overall length of 77 m (253 ft), a beam of 13.0 m (42.7 ft), and a full load displacement of 2,200 tons. It is powered by two Mitsui-Burmeister & Wain diesel engines generating 5,000 hp (3,700 kW), enabling a maximum speed of 18 kn (33 km/h; 21 mph) and an operational range of 6,900 nmi (12,800 km; 7,900 mi) at 15 kn (28 km/h; 17 mph). The interior layout accommodates up to 44 guests and a crew complement of 81 personnel.

== History ==
=== Garcia administration (1957–1961) ===
Commissioned into the Philippine Navy on March 7, 1959, the vessel served as the navy's flagship until December 1961 under its original name, RPS Lapu-Lapu (PY-77). The first presidential engagement held aboard took place on April 7, 1959. Shortly after, from April 19 to June 4, 1959, the vessel undertook its first major cruise, serving as a floating trade and cultural exposition across ports in South Vietnam, Thailand, Singapore, Indonesia, Hong Kong, Japan, South Korea, and Taiwan. During this early period, the ship hosted several high-profile dignitaries, including General Douglas MacArthur during his sentimental farewell visit to the Philippines in 1961.

=== Macapagal administration (1961–1965) ===
On December 31, 1961, President Diosdado Macapagal revoked the vessel's status as flagship. Viewing the ship as too luxurious, he ordered its conversion into a naval troop transport. On October 9, 1962, the vessel was officially renamed RPS Roxas (TP-71) in honor of the fifth president of the Philippines, Manuel Roxas, marking the first instance in Philippine naval history that a ship was named after a president. For his own maritime travel, Macapagal utilized an older, alternative presidential yacht, the RPS Santa Maria, which he renamed RPS Pag-Asa.

=== Marcos administration (1965–1986) ===
Following his accession to the presidency, President Ferdinand Marcos reversed the transport classification and restored the vessel to its original role as the primary presidential yacht. On January 11, 1967, it was renamed RPS The President (TP-777), and on July 1, 1971, its name was changed to BRP Ang Pangulo (TP-777).

Following the 1986 revolution, the ship became widely associated with the lavish lifestyle of the Marcos family after video archives from Malacañang Palace were made public. Among the released footage was a lavish September 1985 party held by Irene Marcos aboard Ang Pangulo. The event drew significant public criticism due to the contemporary economic crisis in the Philippines and the recorded attendance of foreign diplomats, including U.S. Ambassador Stephen W. Bosworth, which critics highlighted as an explicit display of the administration's profligacy.

=== Cory Aquino (1986–1992) to Estrada administrations (1998–2001) ===
President Corazon Aquino stripped the vessel of its luxury status to lower government expenditure, as monthly maintenance costs had reached ₱400,000. On September 24, 1986, the hull classification was formally reassigned to AT-25. Aquino attempted to clear the asset by listing it for sale at $5.5 million in September 1986, but it remained unsold. Under the succeeding administration of President Fidel V. Ramos, the vessel was retained and used for state functions, notably hosting Chinese President Jiang Zemin during his state visit. President Joseph Estrada subsequently authorized a comprehensive overhaul of the ship's accommodations between 1998 and 2000, utilizing it as a fully equipped mobile presidential office and command center during extended security operations in Mindanao.

=== Arroyo administration (2001–2010) ===
On March 6, 2009, right before the vessel's 50th commissioning anniversary, President Gloria Macapagal Arroyo renamed the ship BRP Pag-Asa (AT-25) during formal naval ceremonies to reflect the legacy of the earlier vessels used by Magsaysay and Macapagal. Operating under Naval Taskforce "Sealion," the vessel was regularly reassigned from ceremonial duties to execute humanitarian regional support, medical outreach, and emergency sea rescue missions throughout the archipelago. Under Executive Order No. 880, signed in May 2010, the Malacañang Museum (later the Presidential Museum and Library) was tasked with curating the historic spaces of the presidential yacht, then named BRP Pag-Asa, in coordination with the Philippine Navy.

=== Benigno Aquino III administration (2010–2016) ===
Following his inauguration, President Benigno Aquino III adopted an austere approach to executive assets. On December 14, 2011, during a naval commissioning ceremony for newly acquired fleet assets, Aquino officially restored the vessel's historic name, BRP Ang Pangulo (AT-25), stating the reversion was intended "to continue the heritage and carry the honor and prestige of the Philippine presidency."

On August 6, 2013, BRP Ang Pangulo served as the primary observation platform for the president during a major military milestone. Aquino boarded the yacht at Alva Pier in Subic, Zambales, using it as a floating stage to witness and welcome the arrival of the Navy's newly acquired Del Pilar-class frigate, BRP Ramon Alcaraz, signaling a shift toward territorial defense capability under the AFP Modernization Act.

=== Duterte administration (2016–2022) ===
Though initially pledging to sell the ship to fund veterans' healthcare program expansions, President Rodrigo Duterte retained the asset after defense spokespersons clarified the statutory limitations governing the disposal of active military property. Duterte instead ordered its formal designation as an auxiliary hospital ship.

During the COVID-19 pandemic, the ship was configured into a floating 28-bed medical isolation facility at Pier 13, Manila South Harbor, to treat frontline military personnel. Following the landfall of Typhoon Rai (Odette) in January 2022, the vessel deployed directly to Siargao and the Dinagat Islands as part of a civil-military stability operation, delivering primary emergency medical care to over 2,450 displaced civilians.

=== Marcos Jr. administration (2022–present) ===
In September 2022 under president Bongbong Marcos, the ship served as the platform for deck landing qualification (DLQ) training conducted by the Philippine Air Force's 250th Presidential Airlift Wing (PAW). The training involved flight operations using the ship's helicopter deck to improve interoperability between naval and air assets assigned to the Presidential Security Group. According to the Philippine Navy, the exercise helped ensure that the vessel remained a ready platform in support of the President of the Philippines.

== Predecessors ==
Prior to the acquisition of the Ang Pangulo in 1959, several other vessels served as the official presidential yacht of the Philippines:

Vessel	Service Years	Origin and Notes	Ref(s)
Apo (formerly USS Yacona)	1921–1932	An 1898 Scottish-built steam yacht (originally named Yacona). Transferred to the Philippine Insular Government in July 1921, it served as the first designated governor-general and presidential yacht until its return to the United States federal government in 1932.	
BRP Banahaw (formerly Casiana)	1936–1941	An oil-burning steam yacht built in 1908 (originally named Cassandra and later Casiana). Acquired by the Philippine Commonwealth in 1936 for $50,000, she was commissioned into the Coast Guard as Banahaw and utilized by President Manuel L. Quezon. She was sunk by Japanese air attacks off Corregidor on December 29, 1941.	
Orchid (formerly USCGC Orchid)	1945–1948	A 190-foot Manzanita-class buoy tender launched in 1908 for the US Lighthouse Service (later transferred to the US Coast Guard). Decommissioned in December 1945, she was transferred to the Philippine government and briefly utilized by President Manuel Roxas.	
Apo II (later Pag-asa / Santa Maria)	1948–1959	A former US Navy Admirable-class minesweeper (USS Quest). Transferred to the Philippines in July 1948, she served as the primary presidential yacht for Presidents Elpidio Quirino, Ramon Magsaysay, and Carlos P. Garcia before being relegated to auxiliary duties upon the commissioning of Lapu-Lapu (the future Ang Pangulo).	
