= Lighthouse Board =

Lighthouse Board may refer to:

- Northern Lighthouse Board, UK, formed in 1786
- United States Lighthouse Board, formed in 1851
- Lighthouse Board of Canada, formed in 1904
- Commission des phares (France), formed in 1811
