= USLHT Manzanita =

American lighthouse and buoy tender (1908–1946)

Coordinates: 47.5316°N 122.2170°W

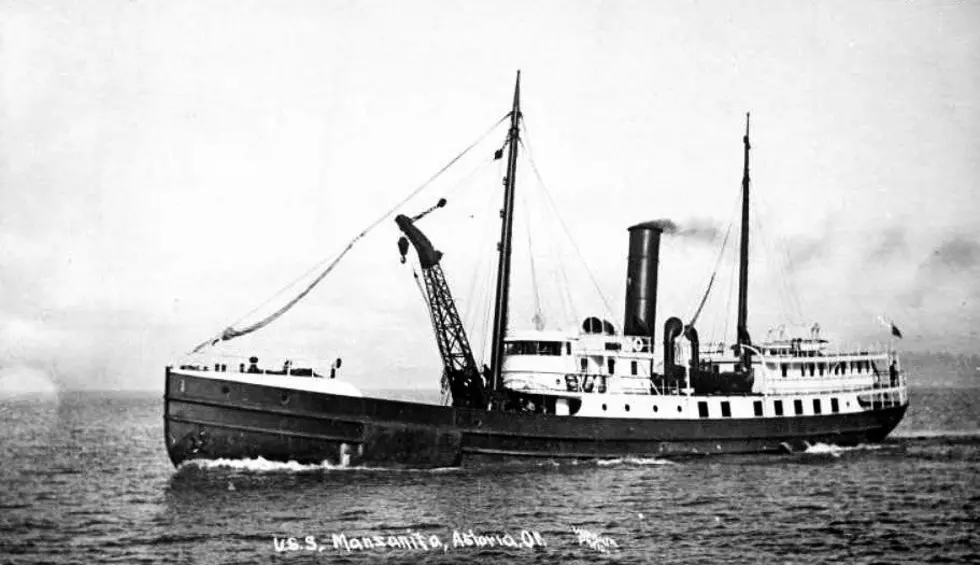
- USLHT Manzanita in 1908

History

United States
- Name: USLHT Manzanita (1908–1917; 1919–1942); USS Manzanita (1917–1919); USCGC Manzanita (1942–1946)
- Namesake: Species of the genus Arctostaphylos
- Owner: United States Lighthouse Service (1908–1917; 1919–1942); United States Navy (1917–1919); United States Coast Guard (1942–1946)
- Builder: New York Shipbuilding Company
- Laid down: 1906
- Completed: 1908
- Commissioned: 7 June 1908
- In service: 1908–1946
- Home port: Astoria, Oregon
- Identification: Call sign: NLU (c. 1924); GVRJ (c. 1927); NRYQ (c. 1945)
- Fate: Sold in 1949, turned into a house

General characteristics
- Class & type: Manzanita-class tender
- Type: Lighthouse tender; Buoy tender
- Length: 190 feet (58 m)
- Beam: 30 feet (9.1 m)
- Depth: 13.25 feet (4.04 m)
- Installed power: 2 x Scotch marine boilers (1908); 2 x Water-tube boilers (Late 1920s)
- Propulsion: 2 x triple-expansion steam engines
- Speed: 12 knots (14 mph; 22 km/h)

USLHT Manzanita was the lead ship of the Manzanita class of tenders. She was originally built in 1908 for the United States Lighthouse Service, but served under the United States Navy in World War I, and then under the United States Coast Guard during World War II. The tender's stern was sold in 1949, after Manzanita was decommissioned, and turned into a house.

== Construction ==
Manzanita was built by the New York Shipbuilding Company in Camden, New Jersey. She was the lead ship of the Manzanita-class, a class of tenders built for the United States Lighthouse Service. Construction began in 1906, and she was completed in 1908. The tender was named for Manzanita, the common name of a species of evergreen shrub of the genus Arctostaphylos, which grows in the North American Pacific coast. Manzanita was commissioned on 7 June 1908 as a United States Lighthouse Tender (USLHT). She was assigned the call sign NLU.

=== Specifications ===
Manzanita was 190 feet (58 m) long, 30 feet (9.1 m) wide, and had a depth of 13.25 feet (4.04 m). She had two triple-expansion steam engines and two Scotch marine boilers that burned coal, together capable of producing 1,100 shaft horsepower. She could make 12 knots (14 mph; 22 km/h). The tender was manned by five officers and 23 crewmen.

Manzanita was constructed primarily of steel. She had flat sides that allowed buoy pads to be attached, and the sides also reduced the tendency of a buoy to slide beneath the tender's hull when one was alongside the other. Her boom was long enough to permit special rigging for transferring supplies to lighthouses on rocks or cliffs. However, the tender heeled sharply when lifting buoys.

== Service history ==
Following her commissioning, Manzanita—along with two other tenders and three lightships—sailed around Cape Horn for duty along the Pacific Coast. She was transferred to the United States Navy following an executive order signed on 11 April 1917, and she was recommissioned as USS Manzanita. She was returned to the Department of Commerce and the United States Lighthouse Service on 1 July 1919.

Manzanita primarily operated out of Astoria, Oregon. From 1929 until 1941, Manzanita serviced the lighthouses of the Oregon Coast. In 1942, she was transferred to the United States Coast Guard. She was recommissioned as USCGC Manzanita, and given the call sign WAGL-233. In October 1943, she laid anti-submarine cables off of Prince Rupert, British Columbia, and Dutch Harbor, Alaska.

== As a house ==
The tender was decommissioned on 29 November 1946 and set to be scrapped. The stern portion of Manzanita was purchased for $1000 in 1949 by Betty Ekrem, a librarian living in Mercer Island, Washington. It was subsequently transported to Mercer Island via barge. Trees were cut down, the stern was winched up onto the property, and subsequently placed onto the foundation. It was then converted into a house. Ownership of the stern was transferred in 1956 from Betty Ekrem to her father, Ed Ekrem. He sold it in 1971 to John Summers. The Tao family took ownership of the house in 2006. Presently, the house is 1,390 square feet (129 square metres) and is estimated to be worth over $2,000,000.
