= USLHT Marigold =

United States lighthouse tender

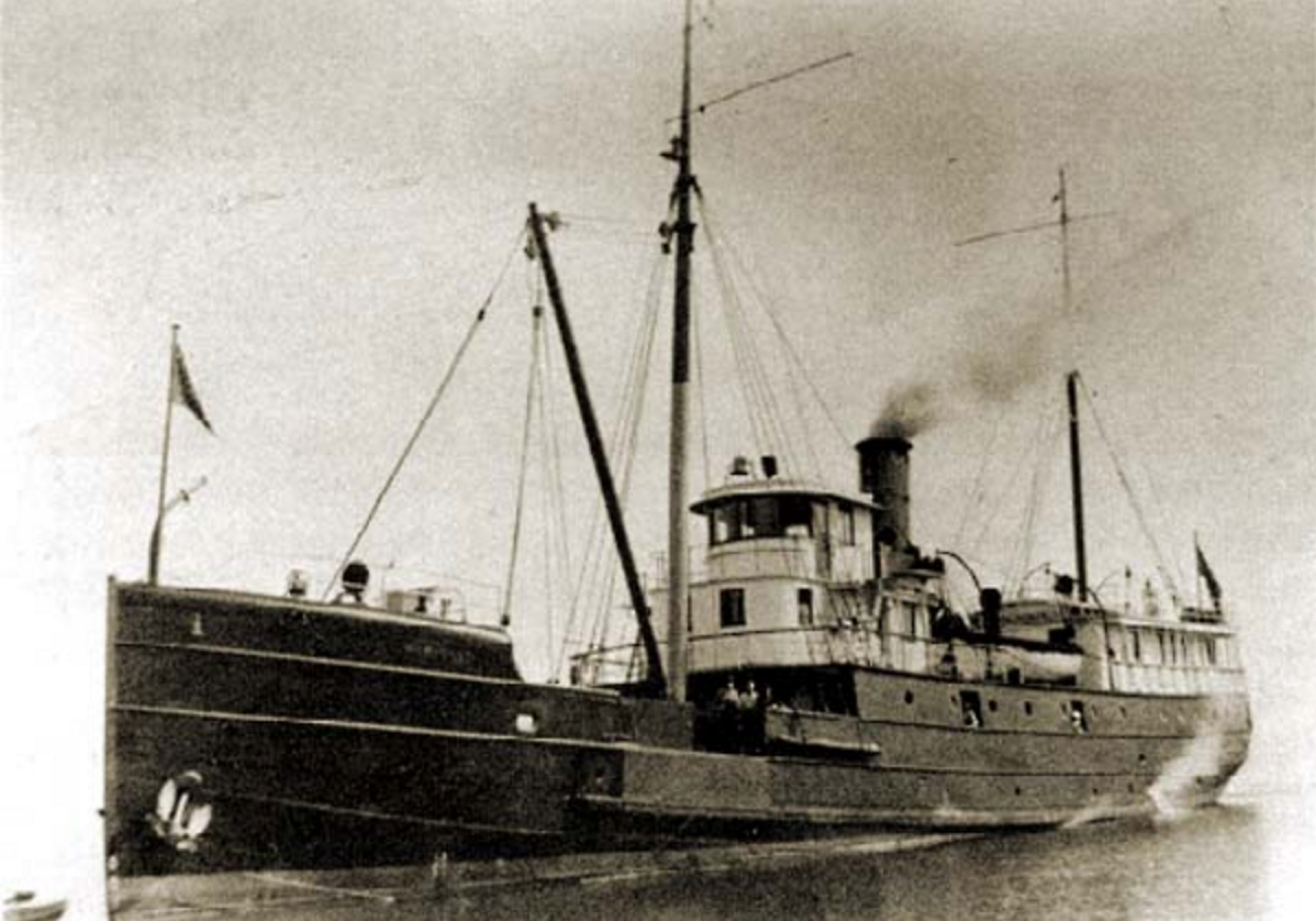
- USLHT Marigold in 1921

History

United States
- Name: USLHT Marigold , 1891; USS Marigold, 1917; USLHT Marigold 1919; USCGC Marigold, 1939
- Launched: 15 November 1890
- Commissioned: 4 October 1891
- Fate: Sold 19 October 1946

United States
- Name: Miss Mudhen II
- Owner: Ira Lyons, 1946; Estelle Lyons, 1960; Michigan Dredging Co., 1965; Bay Harbor Dredging, 1978
- Identification: Official Number 264968

General characteristics as originally built
- Tonnage: 454 gross, 262 net
- Length: 160 ft (49 m)
- Beam: 27 ft (8.2 m)
- Draft: 11.25 ft (3.43 m)
- Speed: 10 knots (19 km/h; 12 mph)
- Complement: 31

USLHT Marigold was built for the United States Lighthouse Service for use as a lighthouse tender on the Great Lakes. She was launched in 1890 and delivered to the lighthouse depot in Detroit early in 1891. Marigold was commissioned in the United States Navy during World War I, becoming USS Marigold. After the war she returned to her role servicing lighthouses, lightships, and buoys on the Great Lakes. When the Lighthouse Service was absorbed into the United States Coast Guard in 1939, she became USCGC Marigold.

The ship was decommissioned in 1945 and sold in 1946. She was extensively rebuilt as a dredge, and renamed Miss Mudhen II. She was used into the late 1980s around western Michigan. Her ultimate fate is unknown.

== Construction and characteristics ==
In 1888 the Lighthouse Board advocated replacing USLHT Warrington, a 20-year-old tender on the Great Lakes. It reported that that, "This steam barge is so old and worn that she will scarcely be fit for duty through another year." Waterfront opinion agreed with the Board, one newspaper writing that "Warrington is of little value as a lighthouse supply ship or anything else." Congress approved $85,000 for the construction of a new lighthouse tender for the Great Lakes on 2 March 1889. Lighthouse Board draughtsmen designed the ship at the lighthouse depot on Staten Island. In December 1889, the Lighthouse Board advertised for bids to build Marigold which were to be opened on 28 January 1890. Detroit Dry Dock Company made the lowest bid of $77,000, and was awarded the contract to build the ship.

Marigold was built at Detroit Dry Dock Company's Wyandotte shipyard. She was launched on 15 November 1890 and had her sea trial on 28 February 1891, during which she ran through ice up to 3 inches (7.6 cm) thick. Her original cost was $84,871.

Marigold's hull was constructed of iron plates between 5/16 inch (7.9 mm) and 9/16 inch (14 mm) thick, riveted together. As originally built, She was 159.5 feet (48.6 m) long overall, and 150 feet (46 m) long between perpendiculars. Her beam was 27 feet (8.2 m) and her depth of hold was 12.33 feet (3.76 m). Over the course of her long service she underwent a number of modifications such that her tonnage, displacement, and draft changed. In 1911 her gross register tonnage was 454 and her net register tonnage was 262. Her light draft was 11.25 feet (3.43 m) and her fully loaded draft was 11.5 feet (3.5 m).

Marigold had a single triple-expansion steam engine whose high, intermediate, and low-pressure cylinders were 14.25, 22, and 36 inches in diameter with a common stroke of 24 inches. The engine had an indicated horsepower of 550. It was built by the Detroit Dry Dock. Steam for the engine was produced by two coal-fired Scotch boilers which were 10.5 feet (3.2 m) in diameter and 10.8 feet (3.3 m) long. The engine drove a single 4-bladed propeller 8.5 feet (2.6 m) in diameter. On her trial trip, this propulsion system drove the ship at 13 knots.

Marigold received a number of enhancements during her career. In 1897, she was fitted with a steam-powered generator and electric lights, a steam-powered steering system, and a new propeller. In 1900 a permanent facility for refueling gas-fired light buoys at sea was installed. Previously, the buoys had to be taken to Detroit to be filled. Several officers' cabins were sacrificed to the new equipment, and a new house structure was built on deck to accommodate the tanks. They had a capacity of 15,000 cubic feet of gas, enough to refill 30 buoys. By 1919 Marigold had been furnished with wireless telegraphy equipment. She was assigned the call sign NAQV. In 1926 radio direction finding equipment, a "Kolstar radio compass" made by the Federal Telegraph Company, was installed. In 1934 a water treatment plant was installed aboard Marigold to improve the safety of drinking lake water.

== U.S. Government service (1891–1945) ==
=== U.S. Lighthouse Service (1891–1917) ===
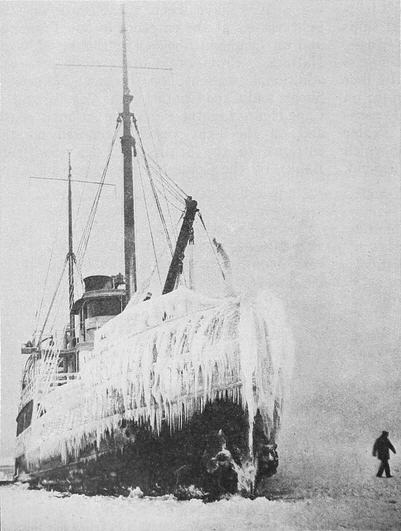
Marigold hemmed in by ice

Marigold was assigned to the Inspector of the 11th Lighthouse District, whose area of responsibility was the U.S. waters of Lake Superior and Lake Huron. She began her work in May 1891, and was commissioned on 4 October 1891.

Marigold's mission was to place, replace, and maintain the buoys in her area, as well as to maintain and supply the remote lighthouses, lightships, and fog signals of her district. Buoy maintenance was complicated by the annual freezing of the Great Lakes. Since ice would damage or sink iron buoys, Marigold had to remove them in the fall and replace them again when the ice melted in the spring. Her service to lighthouses, lightships, and steam-powered fog signals included delivering personnel, food, fuel, mail, and other supplies. As with the buoys, ice complicated this work as well. Lightships were towed to port before each winter and towed out again in the spring.

Ice on the lakes made navigation impossible during the winter months. Marigold typically spent the winter moored, tying up between mid-November and mid-December. The crew began fitting her out for the new season about mid-March, and typically began her first trip of the season in mid-April. In some years persistent ice kept her in port until June.

The officers' quarters aboard Marigold were by no means luxurious, but they were finished attractively in ash, cherry, and black walnut. They were sufficiently comfortable to attract a number of important passengers. Secretary of the Treasury John G. Carlisle took his summer vacation in August 1895 on the Great Lakes. During part of his trip, he went aboard Marigold in Detroit and sailed to Chicago. Carlisle was accompanied by his wife, son, and daughter-in-law. In August 1897 Captain Winfield S. Schley, Chairman of the Lighthouse Board, sailed to Duluth aboard Marigold. Subsequent chairman of the Lighthouse Board who sailed on Marigold include Rear Admiral Francis J. Higginson in 1899, and Rear Admiral Norman Farquhar in 1901.

=== U.S. Navy (1917–1919) ===
On 11 April 1917 President Wilson issued Executive Order 2588 transferring a number of lighthouse tenders to support the American military effort in World War I. Wilson's order transferred Marigold to the Navy. She was commissioned as USS Marigold, the second U.S. naval vessel of that name.

There being no hostilities on the Great Lakes, Marigold continued her work supporting the lighthouses and buoys of her area. During the winter of 1918-1919, Marigold received a major refit at the Detroit Lighthouse Depot. Her boilers were replaced by two new units built by Duluth Boiler Works of Duluth, Minnesota. The wooden derrick on her foredeck was replaced by a steel derrick. Much of her decking was replaced. The total cost of the project was $17,935.

After the war, on 1 July 1919, the components of the Lighthouse Service which had become part of the Navy, including Marigold, were returned to the supervision of the Department of Commerce.

=== U.S. Lighthouse Service (1919–1939) ===
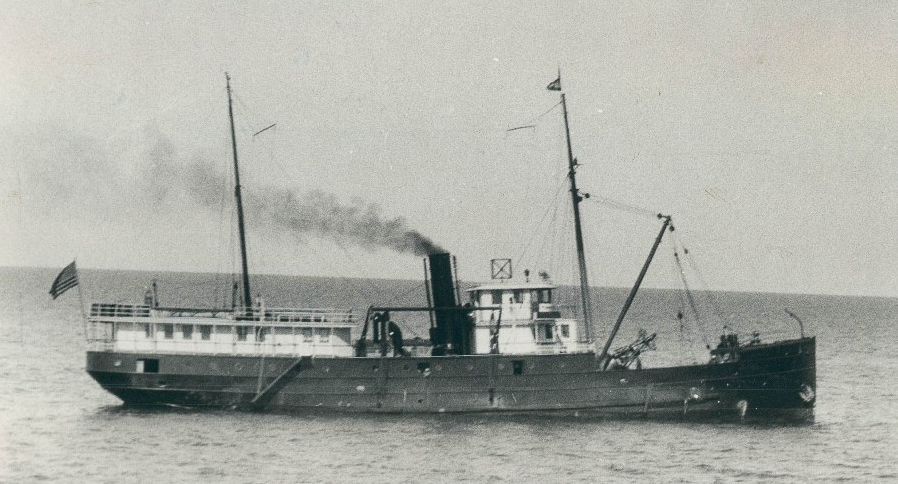
USLHT Marigold in 1931

Released from the Navy, Marigold continued her service to lighthouses, lightships, and buoys in the Great Lakes. In 1923 she delivered wireless equipment to Spectacle Reef and Stanard Rock lighthouses, beginning the process of equipping remote light stations with radio communications.

On 2 October 1929 Marigold's crew was refueling the gas light buoy near Red Cliff, Wisconsin. As the men were preparing the buoy, an explosion took place. Three of the crew were killed, and four others injured in the worst accident of Marigold's career.

=== U.S. Coast Guard (1939–1945) ===
By order of President Franklin Roosevelt, the Coast Guard absorbed the U.S. Lighthouse Service on 1 July 1939. Marigold was commissioned as USCGC Marigold, and given the pennant number WAGL-235. She continued to maintain buoys and lightships, in the Great Lakes While her job did not change, the employment conditions for her crew did. They went from civilian employees to personnel of the Coast Guard.

On 1 November 1941 President Roosevelt signed Executive Order 8929 transferring the Coast Guard from Treasury Department control to Navy Department control. Marigold remained in the Great Lakes and continued her work maintaining aids to navigation, but now part of the 9th Naval District.

==== Obsolescence and sale ====
As early as 1937, the Lighthouse Service sought funding to replace Marigold. Citing her age, structural weakness, and the difficulty of operating in ice conditions, she was characterized as having "insufficient strength for safe service." Nonetheless, as the country approached war, she was retained. In the demobilization at the end of World War II, the Coast Guard announced its intention to retire Marigold on 29 August 1945. She was decommissioned on 3 December 1945. At the time she was relieved, she was the longest serving tender, having been in commission for more than 54 years. She was transferred to the U.S. Maritime Administration for disposal. In August 1946, sealed bids were sought for her sale. She was purchased by Ira J. Lyons on 19 October 1946.

== Commercial Service ==
It is not clear that Lyons put his new ship to work immediately. She appears for the first time in Federal documentation in 1953. At that point, Marigold was renamed Miss Mudhen II, and extensively modified to become a dredge. Her hull was cut down to 106.7 feet (32.5 m) long with a beam of 26.5 feet (8.1 m), and her gross and net tonnage was reduced to 124. Her steam engine was replaced with a gasoline engine of 350 horsepower.

Miss Mudhen II's work history was sparsely reported. In July 1953 she attempted to salvage another dredge which sank in a storm near Ludington, Michigan. During the summer of 1954, Miss Mudhen II dredged channels in Muskegon Lake and at Ferrysburg, Michigan. In July 1960, Miss Mudhen II dredged shipping channels in the Saginaw River. In 1988 the ship used a crane and pile-driving equipment to expand a marina on the Saginaw River.

Ira Lyons died in December 1959, and his wife, Estelle M. Lyons, inherited Miss Mudhen II. In 1965 the ship was sold to Michigan Dredging Company, Inc. of Hart, Michigan. In 1978, the ship was sold again to Bay Harbor Dredging, Inc. of Port Huron, Michigan.

The ship remained in Federal documentation until at least 1989, but her ultimate fate is unknown.
