= Presidential yacht =

Ship used by a head of state

Presidential yacht may refer to a vessel of a country's navy that would be specially used by the country's president. It is common for a vessel to be designated as the presidential yacht during a fleet review.

Some countries (below) have vessels permanently designated as presidential yachts:

== List of presidential yachts ==
=== Egypt ===
The President of Egypt has El Mahrousa as his presidential yacht. The yacht, originally built in 1863 for the Khedive Isma'il Pasha of Egypt, is the oldest superyacht in the world, and as of 2024 the eleventh-largest.

=== Finland ===
The President of Finland has a small private yacht, Kultaranta VIII.

=== India ===
The INS Sumedha is the presidential yacht of India.

=== Indonesia ===
The KRI Bung Karno is the Indonesian presidential yacht.

=== Italy ===
The Italian ship Argo (MEN209) is the presidential yacht of Italy.

=== Philippines ===
- Casiana (1936-1941), renamed Banahaw.
- Orchid (1946-1948)
- Dalisay (1948-1959), renamed Apo, Pagasa, and Santa Maria.
- RPS Lapu-Lapu (1959–present), renamed RPS Roxas, RPS The President, RPS Pag-Asa, and BRP Ang Pangulo.

=== Russia ===
Russia employed presidential yachts serving the Russian presidents, including:

- Olympia (2002–2009), was used by the Russian President Vladimir Putin during his first and second terms.
- Sirius (2010–), was firstly used by the Russian President Dmitri Medvedev
- Graceful (2018–), the most recent presidential yacht

The Russian government also employing the special vessel named Rossiya which was built during the Soviet Union, and used in the internal waters. In 2003 ship named Burevestnik was commissioned to serve the Russia's leaders.

=== Turkey ===
- Presidential Yacht Savarona – The current Turkish presidential yacht; prior to 2010 privately leased while her replacement (below) was in development
- New presidential yacht – The Turkish Government has currently commissioned a new 50 m yacht for the personal use of the president and visiting heads of state. Details of this new yacht first surfaced in September 2008. The yacht is being built at the Istanbul Naval Yard, Pendik, Istanbul and is reported to have a ballistic hull, surface-to-air missiles and high-tech equipment.

=== United States ===
In the past, the United States employed presidential yachts serving the American president:

- USS Mayflower (1906–1929), was decommissioned as a result of economy measures just prior to the Great Depression.
- USS Potomac (1936–1945)
- USS Williamsburg (1945–1953)
- the most recent presidential yacht was USS Sequoia (1933–77).

=== Yugoslavia ===
The most famous is Galeb, the yacht of Marshal Josip Broz Tito.

== See also ==
- List of motor yachts by length
