= Italian ship Argo (MEN209) =

History

Italy
- Name: Argo
- Namesake: Argo
- Ordered: 1
- Builder: Italcraft Gaeta (Latina)
- Laid down: 15 April 1971
- Launched: 20 October 1971
- Commissioned: 3 January 1972
- Home port: La Spezia
- Identification: Pennant number: MEN209
- Motto: Alacre sopra le onde
- Status: Active

General characteristics
- Type: Presidential yacht
- Displacement: 64.47 t (63.45 long tons) full load
- Length: 24.36 m (79 ft 11 in) LOA
- Beam: 5.5 m (18 ft 1 in)
- Draught: 1.93 m (6 ft 4 in)
- Propulsion: - 2 x diesel engines C.R.M. 18D/S-2, 990 kW (1,330 bhp) each; - 2 x shaft and propellers
- Speed: +25 knots (46 km/h; 29 mph)
- Range: 500 nmi (930 km; 580 mi)
- Complement: - 7, of which: - 1 x officer; - 6 x sailors
- Sensors & processing systems: navigation radar

Argo (ex MEN209) is a presidential yacht of the Italian Navy (Marina Militare). The vessel is based at La Spezia classified as a Nave servizi vari (utility vessel).
