= USLHT Orchid =

Lighthouse and buoy tender (1909–1945)

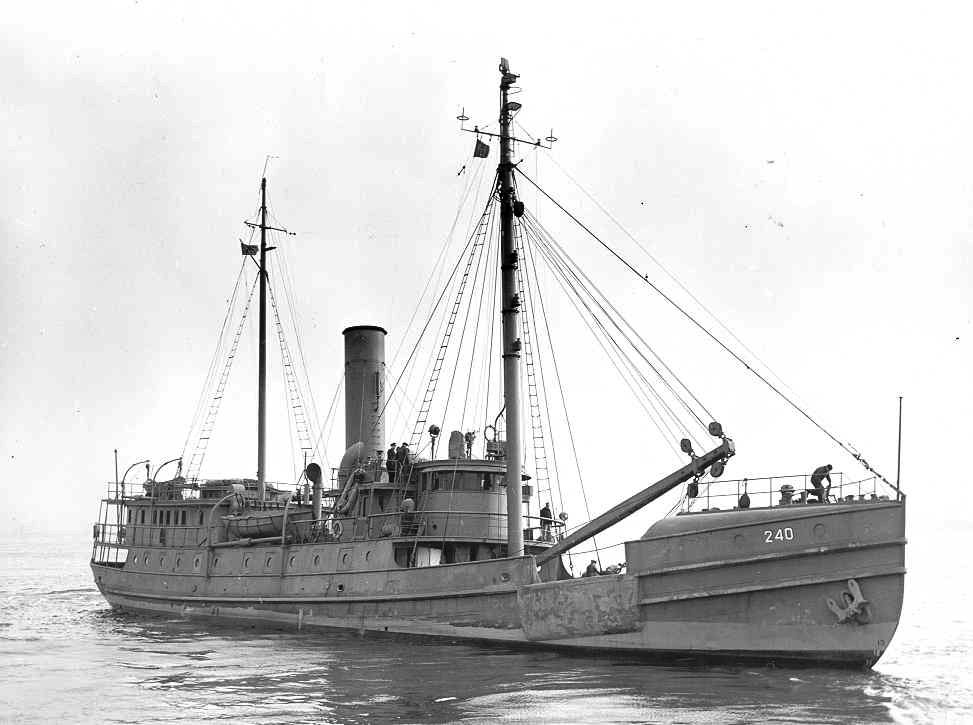
- Orchid, painted grey in wartime livery, in 1946

History

United States
- Name: Orchid
- Namesake: Orchid
- Owner: Department of Commerce (1908–1917); United States Navy (1917–1919); Department of Commerce (1919–1939); United States Coast Guard (1939–1945)
- Operator: United States Lighthouse Service (1908–1917); United States Navy (1917–1919); United States Lighthouse Service (1919–1939); United States Coast Guard (1939–1945)
- Builder: American Brown Boveri Electrical Corporation
- Commissioned: August 5, 1908
- Recommissioned: April 11, 1917 (For USN)
- Decommissioned: July 1, 1919 (From USN)
- In service: 1908–1945
- Reclassified: 1939 (as a buoy tender)
- Identification: Call sign: GVRM (1908–1919); NLM (1919–1939); NRWQ (1939–1945)
- Fate: Sold to Philippine government, 1945

History

Philippines
- Name: Orchid
- Owner: Philippine Navy
- Operator: Philippine Government
- In service: 1946–1948
- Fate: Unknown

General characteristics
- Class & type: Manzanita-class tender
- Type: Lighthouse tender (1908–1939); Buoy tender (1939–1945)
- Length: 190 feet (58 m)
- Beam: 30 feet (9.1 m)
- Depth: 13.25 feet (4.04 m)
- Installed power: 2x triple-expansion steam engines; 2x Scotch marine boilers (1908); 2x triple-expansion steam engines; 2x Water-tube boilers (Late 1920s)
- Speed: 12 knots (14 mph; 22 km/h) (1908); 13.5 knots (15.5 mph; 25.0 km/h) (1945)
- Complement: 33 (1908); 45 (1945)
- Armament: 1x 3"/23, 2x 20mm, 2x depth charge racks (1945)

USLHT Orchid was a Manzanita-class tender built for the United States Lighthouse Service. She was transferred to the United States Coast Guard and redesignated USCGC Orchid (WAGL-240) in 1939. She served from 1908 to 1945.

== Construction ==
Orchid was built in 1908 by the American Brown Boveri Electrical Corporation—a subsidiary of the New York Shipbuilding Corporation—in Camden, New Jersey. She was named after the plant family Orchidaceae. She was a Manzanita-class tender, named after the first of a class of eight tenders constructed. She was completed in July 1908. She was commissioned on August 5, 1908, and assigned the callsign GVRM. Her prefix was USLHT, which stood for United States Lighthouse Tender.

=== Specifications ===
Orchid was 190 feet (58 m) long, 30 feet (9.1 m) wide, and had a depth of 13.25 feet (4.04 m). She had two triple-expansion steam engines and two Scotch marine boilers that burned coal, together capable of producing 1,100 shaft horsepower. She could make 12 knots (14 mph; 22 km/h). The tender was manned by five officers and 23 crewmen.

Orchid was constructed primarily of steel. She had flat sides that allowed buoy pads to be attached, and the sides also reduced the tendency of a buoy to slide beneath the tender's hull when one was alongside the other. Her boom was long enough to permit special rigging for transferring supplies to lighthouses on rocks or cliffs. However, the tender heeled sharply when lifting buoys.

== Service history ==
=== American service ===
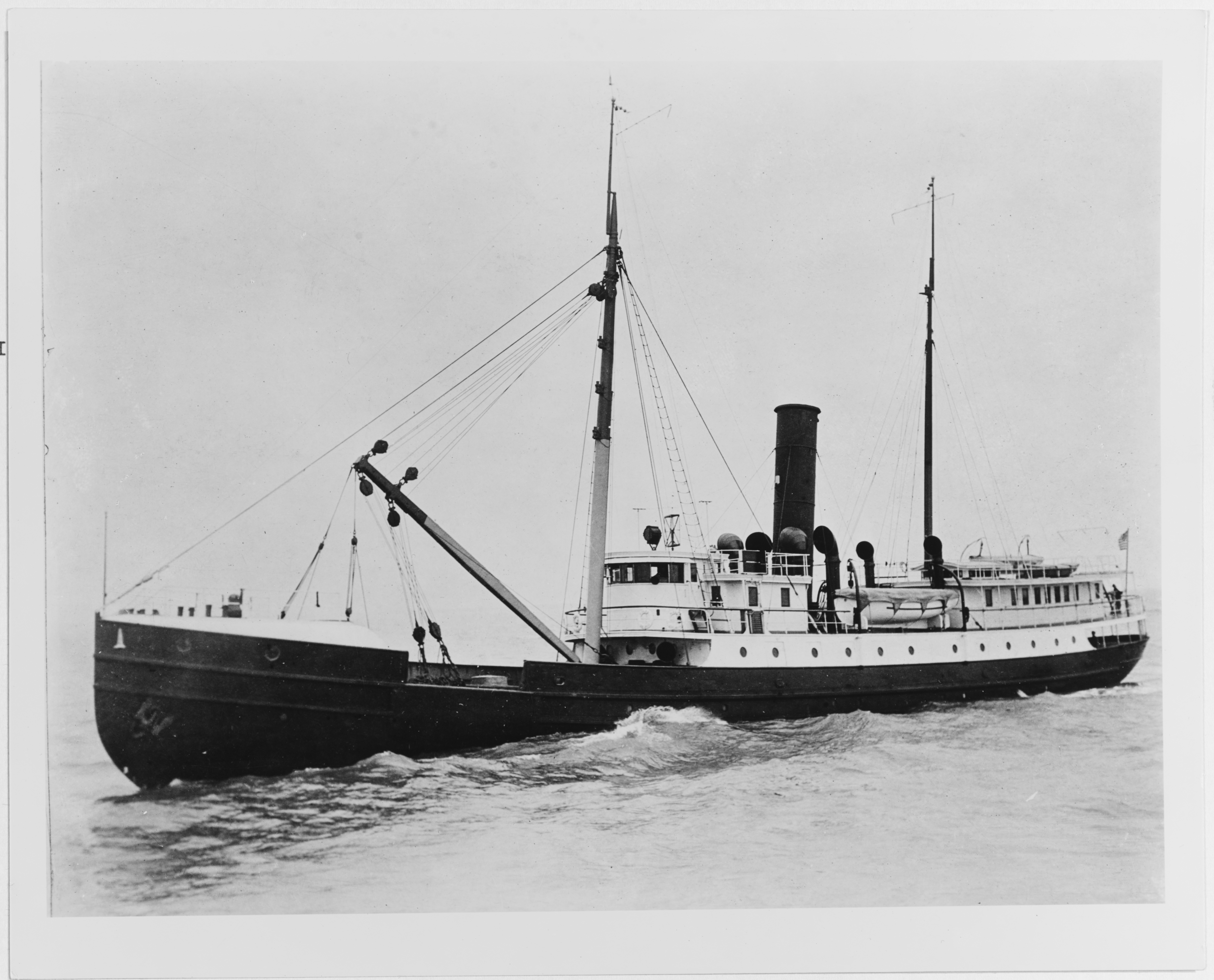
Orchid photographed sometime before the Second World War

Orchid was assigned to Baltimore in 1908 as a lighthouse tender. She was operated by the United States Lighthouse Service, largely serving in the Chesapeake Bay. She was assigned to attend lighthouse stations in the bay. On April 11, 1917, she was acquired by the United States Navy. The tender was returned to the Department of Commerce on July 1, 1919, and was rebuilt. Orchid's callsign was changed to NLM. In the late 1920s, Orchid was converted to use oil as fuel. The tender's Scotch boilers were replaced with water-tube boilers. She was reassigned to Norfolk, Virginia, in 1935.

When the United States Lighthouse Service was merged with the United States Coast Guard in 1939, Orchid was transferred to the military branch and was redesignated as United States Coast Guard Cutter Orchid (WAGL-240), with the call sign NRWQ. She was reassigned as a buoy tender, and would operate out of Portsmouth for the duration of the Second World War.

During the war, Orchid was painted grey. She swept both the channel leading into Hampton Roads in Virginia and Cape Fear in North Carolina. The tender never encountered a U-boat nor participated in an attack on one, though the tender did lay red nun buoys marking the wrecks of torpedoed ships. On one occasion, Orchid picked up the corpse of a German officer despite orders not to do so, and caused a stir amongst Navy command to the point where they were directly told to stop picking up corpses.

In 1945, she underwent a major refit. Orchid was armed with one 3"/23 anti-aircraft gun, two Oerlikon 20mm guns and two depth charge racks. Her crew capacity was also raised from 33 to 45, and her speed was upgraded to 13.5 knots (15.5 mph; 25.0 km/h).The tender was decommissioned on December 1, 1945, and sold to the Philippine government.

=== Filipino service ===
Orchid served as the presidential yacht and flagship of the Philippine Navy. However, she had other miscellaneous uses. The yacht was used as a propaganda piece, carrying President Manual Roxas on a political tour prior to the 1947 Senate elections. These sorts of uses had resulted in a scandal in August, where Senate minority leader Cipirano Primicias claimed that the Liberal Party used the yacht while campaigning in the southern islands. Orchid assisted in relief efforts in December 1947 following Typhoon Jean, traveling to the island of Samar. She served as presidential yacht until 1948, when she was replaced with the former USS Quest, which had been renamed Apo-21.
