= Confederate States Lighthouse Bureau =

Former administrative bureau of the Confederate States of America

Agency overview
- Formed: March 6, 1861
- Preceding agency: United States Lighthouse Board
- Dissolved: 1865
- Superseding agency: United States Lighthouse Board
- Jurisdiction: Lighthouses and navigational aids within the Confederate States of America
- Agency executive: Raphael Semmes Edward F. Pedgard Ebenezer Farrand Thomas E. Martin
- Parent agency: (Confederate States of America) Confederate States Department of the Treasury

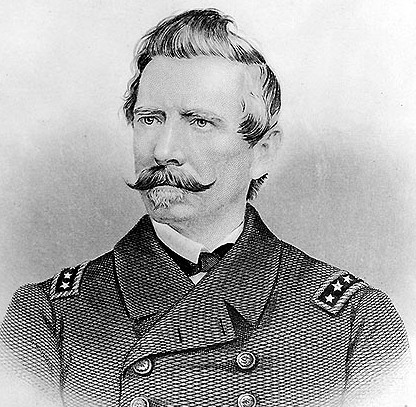
Raphael Semmes

The Confederate States Lighthouse Bureau was an administrative bureau within the Confederate States Department of the Treasury which was responsible for the upkeep of lighthouses and other navigational aids along Confederate shores.

== Overview ==
The Confederate States Lighthouse Bureau was formed by an act of the Provisional Confederate Congress on March 5, 1861, to oversee the construction and care of all aids to navigation in the Confederate States of America. In the portion of the act establishing the Lighthouse Bureau, the position of Chief of the Lighthouse Bureau was declared to be open only to commissioned officers of the Confederate Navy. Act No. 51 also declared the Lighthouse Bureau was to divide the shores of the Confederate States of America into no more than five separate districts which would be the responsibilities of five lieutenants acting as district superintendents. The act also authorized the President to direct that military engineers construct and maintain lighthouses and navigational aids. The Chief of the Bureau was to report directly to the Secretary of the Treasury on a yearly basis. The Bureau's papers are housed in the National Archives in Washington, D.C.
