= United States Lighthouse Board =

Former agency of the United States government

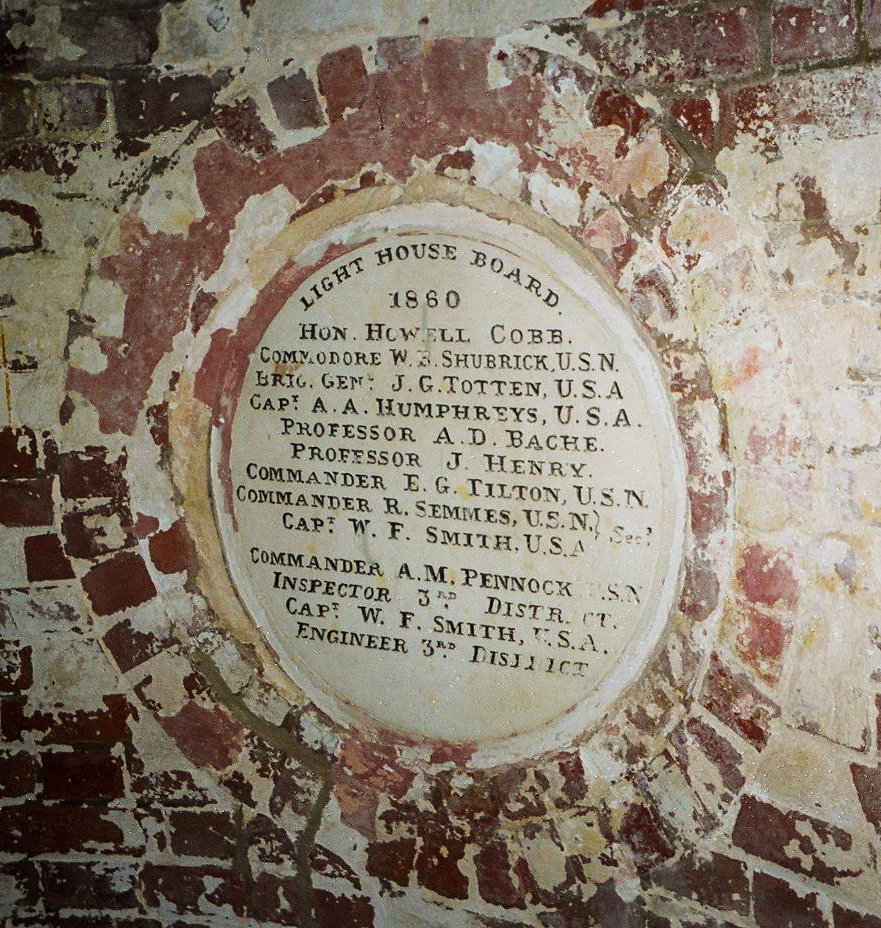
Seal at Montauk Point Light listing the members of the U.S. Lighthouse Board in 1860.

The United States Lighthouse Board was the second agency of the U.S. federal government, under the Department of Treasury, responsible for the construction and maintenance of all lighthouses and navigation aids in the United States, between 1852 and 1910. The new agency was created following complaints of the shipping industry of the previous administration of lighthouses under the Treasury's Lighthouse Establishment, which had had jurisdiction since 1791, and since 1820, been under the control of Stephen Pleasonton.

The quasi-military board first met on April 28, 1851, and with its establishment, the administration of lighthouses and other aids to navigation would take their largest leap toward modernization since the inception of federal government control. In 1910, the Lighthouse Board was disestablished in favor of a more civilian Lighthouse Service, under the Department of Commerce and Labor; later the Lighthouse Service was merged into the United States Coast Guard in 1939.

== Founding ==
By 1847, the United States Congress became serious about reforming the Lighthouse Establishment which had been in existence since 1791 and in response to a number of complaints, the U.S. Congress removed the responsibility for the construction of six new light stations from the U.S. Treasury Department's Fifth Auditor (Stephen Pleasonton), and transferred it to the supervision of the United States Army's, long-time construction agency, the Corps of Engineers. When it became clear that this would not alleviate the underlying problems in the Lighthouse Establishment, Congress then felt compelled to deal the final blow to Pleasonton's administration. The ensuing congressional investigation took more than four years to effect a change in the administration of navigation aids along the American coasts. During that time, congressional appointee, Lt. Jenkins of the United States Coast Survey conducted interviews with pilots and mariners, engaged in domestic and foreign research, and was involved in a number of hearings into existing navigational aids administration.

On March 3, 1851, the United States Congress passed "An Act Making Appropriations for Light House, Light Boats, Buoys, &c." Section 8 of the act stated:

The Secretary of the Treasury is authorized and required to cause a board to be convened at as early a day as may be practical after the passage of that act to be comprised of two officers of the Navy of high rank, two officers of Engineers of the Army, and such civil officers of scientific attainments as may be under the orders or at the disposition of the Treasury Department, and a junior officer of the Navy to act as Secretary to said board, whose duty it shall be under instructions from the Treasury Department to inquire into the condition of the Lighthouse Establishment of the United States, and make a general detailed report and programme to guide legislation in extending and improving our present system of construction, illumination, inspection, and superintendence.

The Lighthouse Board resulted from this mandate, and its original members consisted of William B. Shubrick, and Samuel F. Du Pont, U.S. Navy; James Kearney, U.S. Topographical Engineers; civilian academics Alexander Dallas Bache, Superintendent of the U.S. Coast Survey, and Joseph Henry, Secretary of the Smithsonian Institution; and Lt. Thornton Jenkins, U.S. Navy, who acted as secretary.

== Later developments ==
These men attracted others of similar quality to lighthouse duty, both on the board and in district offices. The country was organized into 12 lighthouse districts, each having an inspector (a naval officer) who was charged with building the lighthouses and seeing that they remained in good condition and that the lens was in operation. After a few years the inspectors became overloaded with work and an engineer (an army officer) was appointed to each district to tend to the construction and maintenance of lighthouses.

The Lighthouse Board moved quickly in applying new technology, particularly in purchasing and installing new Fresnel lenses and constructing screw-pile lighthouses. The Board also oversaw the construction of the first lighthouses on the west coast. By the time of the Civil War, all lighthouses had Fresnel lenses.

Previously, under the Establishment, the local collectors of customs were in charge of the lighthouses and other aids to navigation. In time, all duties regarding aids to navigation were taken from them. The Board demanded that only those who could read were to be appointed as keepers in order that they be able to read their written instructions. These instructions were detailed and covered everything possible about the operation of lighthouses, leaving little discretion to the keeper. The Board struggled to eliminate politics from its activities, and slowly the organization became a professional career agency, helped greatly by the Civil Service Reform Acts of 1871 and 1883. Keepers became civil service employees in 1896. Most important, the Board was constantly mindful of advancing technology and took advantage of new types of lighthouses, buoys, or fog signals, as well as improvement in lighthouse optics. Over the next five decades several advances in lighthouse construction technology took place including the development of the exposed screwpile lighthouses, exoskeleton lighthouses, waveswept interlocking stone lighthouses, iron caisson lighthouses, and breakwater lighthouses.

In the 1850s the Board prescribed color schemes for the buoys, as well as range lights and day markers; and the buoy system was standardized. Classification systems were also developed to mark the nation's waterways. Iron buoys were introduced to replace the more expensive copper-clad wooden buoys. The Lighthouse Board also began printing changes made in aids to navigation as a Notice to Mariners.

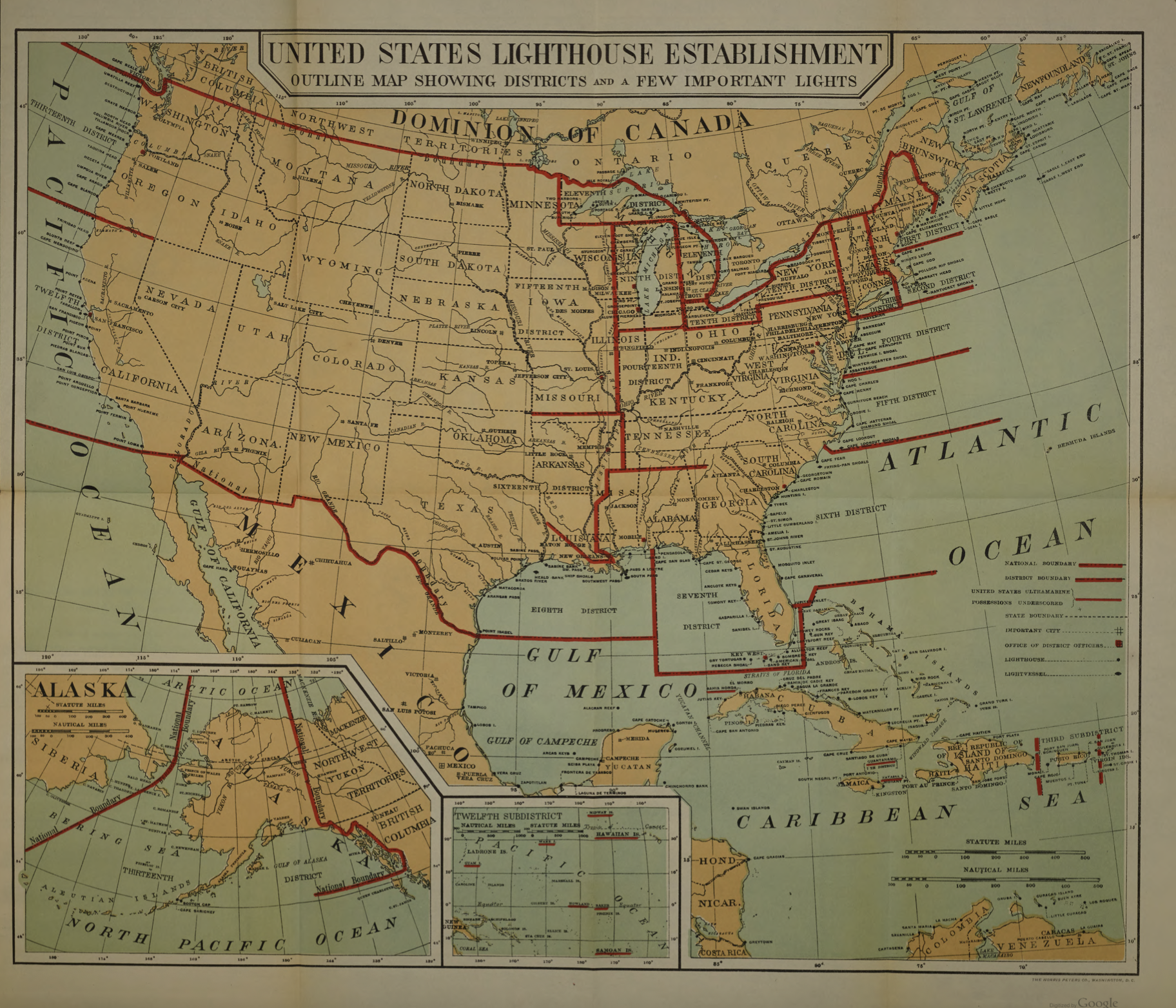
Lighthouse Establishment districts in 1907

Several advances in the technology of fog signals were made during the 1850s. In 1851, an experimental air fog whistle and reed horn was installed at Beavertail Lighthouse at the entrance to Narragansett Bay, Rhode Island. At first this sound signal was powered by a horse-operated treadmill and later by an internal combustion steam engine. Around 1851, mechanically rung fog bells were introduced. The striking mechanism was governed by a weight attached to a flywheel, and later internally run by clockworks. The strokes of the fog signals were timed deliberately to afford each signal a unique sound characteristic. The bell signal was gradually replaced by three variations of that instrument. The first was an ordinary locomotive whistle, enlarged and modified and blown by steam from a high-pressure tubular boiler. The second was a reed-trumpet, and in 1866 the third variation, a siren-trumpet. Although the fog bell signal was still used for warning vessels over short distances, other fog signals started to supersede the smaller bell signal. Bells were also used on buoys; later whistling buoys were invented by J. M. Courtenay and were first in use in 1876. The first gas-lighted buoy was installed in 1882. The gong buoy was invented in 1923.

In 1876, under the management of Chief Clerk Arnold B. Johnson, the Lighthouse Board began to circulate and maintain traveling lighthouse libraries. These libraries would continue to be in service until the 1930s.

In 1886, a new technology was tested in the illumination of the Statue of Liberty—electricity. The electrical lighting of the statue, under the Lighthouse Board's care from 1886 to 1902, marks the beginning of the "modern age" in lighthouse illumination. In 1900, the Lighthouse Board began converting lighthouses to electric service; however, because of the lack of direct access to power lines, the conversion came about slowly.

== See also ==
- Confederate States Lighthouse Bureau
- United States Coast Guard History and Heritage Sites
