= USS Quest (AM-281) =

Minesweeper of the United States Navy

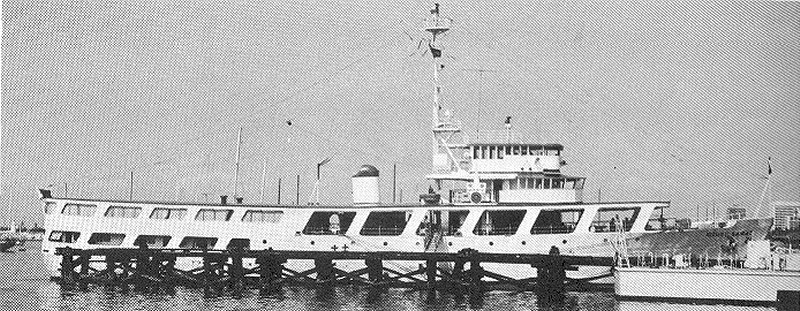
- As RPS Mount Samat (APO-21) of the Philippine Navy

History

United States
- Name: USS Quest
- Builder: Gulf Shipbuilding Company
- Laid down: 24 November 1943
- Launched: 16 March 1944
- Commissioned: 25 October 1944
- Decommissioned: May 1946
- Stricken: 29 September 1947
- Fate: Transferred to the Philippines, 2 July 1948

History

Philippines
- Name: RPS Pag-asa (APO-21)
- Acquired: 2 July 1948
- Renamed: RPS Santa Maria, 1955
- Renamed: RPS Mount Samat (TK-21)
- Decommissioned: 1970
- Fate: Sank at Sangley Point during Typhoon Dot (Anding) on 21 September 1993

General characteristics
- Class & type: Admirable-class minesweeper
- Displacement: 650 long tons (660 t)
- Length: 184 ft 6 in (56.24 m)
- Beam: 33 ft (10 m)
- Draft: 9 ft 9 in (2.97 m)
- Propulsion: 2 × ALCO 539 diesel engines, 1,710 shp (1.3 MW); Farrel-Birmingham single reduction gear; 2 shafts
- Speed: 14.8 knots (27.4 km/h)
- Complement: 104
- Armament: 1 × 3"/50 caliber gun DP; 2 × twin Bofors 40 mm guns; 1 × Hedgehog anti-submarine mortar; 2 × Depth charge tracks

Service record
- Part of: US Pacific Fleet (1944-1946)
- Awards: 2 Battle stars

USS Quest (AM-281) was an Admirable-class minesweeper built for the United States Navy during World War II. She was decommissioned in 1947 after wartime service and transferred to the Philippine Navy in 1948 where she served as presidential yacht RPS Pag-asa (APO-21). In 1955, she was renamed Santa Maria and, later, Mount Samat (TK-21), serving as a patrol corvette of the Miguel Malvar class. She was decommissioned from the Philippine Navy in 1970; beyond that, her fate is not reported in secondary sources.

== Career ==
Quest was laid down 24 November 1943 by Gulf Shipbuilding Co., Chickasaw, Alabama; launched 16 March 1944; sponsored by Mrs. O. R. Johnson, and commissioned 25 October 1944.

After fitting out, training, and shakedown exercises, Quest sailed for Portland, Maine, 21 December to report for duty with task group CTG 23.9. Upon arriving at Portland, the minesweeper participated in antisubmarine exercises until departing for Norfolk, Virginia, 29 December. Arriving 31 December, she remained there until 4 January 1945, when she departed for the Panama Canal Zone en route to the Pacific Fleet. During her voyage to the Panama Canal Zone, she served as convoy escort to repair ship Coronis and oiler Kaweah.

Arriving at San Diego, California, 24 January, Quest conducted exercises along the U.S. West Coast until 1 March, when she became the school ship at the Naval Small Craft Training Center, San Pedro, California. Relieved of this duty 24 March, she sailed for San Diego to take up target towing duties until late April, when she returned to San Pedro to once again resume her training ship duties. Detached from this duty 20 August, she sailed for Pearl Harbor, arriving 28 August.

Departing Pearl Harbor 3 September, as part of task unit TU 10.15.16, she sailed for Eniwetok Atoll. She then sailed to Okinawa, via Saipan, arriving 3 October. Quest participated in minesweeping operations in and around Okinawa and Southern Japan until 5 November when she sailed for the East China Sea in company with Harry F. Bauer, Garland and Notable.

After clearing minefields in the area, the minesweeper returned to Sasebo, Japan arriving in late November. Quest participated in minesweeping operations in Japan until 20 February 1946, when she began a voyage to Eniwetok Atoll, acting as escort for YMS-431 and YMS-439. Arriving at Eniwetok 12 March, Quest served as a logistics support vessel for the two YMSs as they swept mines around Eniwetok in preparation for nuclear testing under Operation Crossroads. On 23 March Quest, in company with YMS-57 sailed for Subic Bay arriving 11 April. She remained there until 2 May, at which time she was decommissioned.

Struck from the U.S. Naval Vessel Register 29 September 1947, Quest was not yet through with her naval service, for on 2 July 1948, she was transferred to the Philippines. Converted to the Presidential yacht she was designated APO-21 and commissioned later that year. She was renamed Pag-asa, and has served under the names Santa Maria and Mount Samat. She was decommissioned from the Philippine Navy in 1970; She sunk on September 21, 1993 while berthed at Sangley Point during the height of Typhoon Dot, locally known as Anding.

== Honors and awards ==
As USS Quest, the ship was awarded two battle stars for her World War II service.
