= USS Anemone (1864) =

Gunboat of the United States Navy

History

United States
- Laid down: date unknown
- Launched: 1864 in Philadelphia, Pennsylvania
- Acquired: 13 August 1864
- Commissioned: 14 September 1864 at the Philadelphia Navy Yard
- Decommissioned: 28 September 1865 at New York City
- Stricken: 1865 (est.)
- Home port: Beaufort, North Carolina; New York Navy Yard
- Fate: Sold, 25 October 1865

General characteristics
- Displacement: 156 tons
- Length: 99 ft (30 m)
- Beam: 20 ft 5 in (6.22 m)
- Depth of hold: 8 ft 4 in (2.54 m)
- Propulsion: steam engine; screw-propelled
- Speed: 11 knots
- Complement: 30
- Armament: two 24-pounder smoothbore guns two 12-pounder smoothbore guns

The first USS Anemone was a steamer acquired by the Union Navy during the American Civil War. She was used by the Union Navy as a tugboat in support of the Union Navy blockade of Confederate waterways.

== Constructed and commissioned at Philadelphia in 1864 ==
Anemone—a screw tug built in 1864 at Philadelphia, Pennsylvania—was purchased by the US Navy from S. & J. M. Flannagan on 13 August 1864 at Philadelphia prior to her documentation as a merchantman; named Anemone; fitted out by the Philadelphia Navy Yard for naval service; and commissioned there on 14 September 1864.

== Civil War service ==
=== Assigned to the North Atlantic Blockade ===
Assigned to the North Atlantic Blockading Squadron, Anemone reported to Rear Admiral Samuel Phillips Lee at Beaufort, North Carolina, on 20 September 1864 and received orders to join in the cordon of Union ships guarding the western bar off Wilmington, North Carolina. She promptly took station, but soon thereafter suffered a rudder casualty and was forced to retire to the Norfolk Navy Yard for repairs.

=== Participating in the attack on Fort Fisher ===
The tug returned to waters off Wilmington early in December and took part in the abortive attack on Fort Fisher on Christmas Eve 1864. She then received orders to Beaufort, North Carolina, where she served through the end of the Civil War and into the ensuing summer.

=== Assisting in the rescue of the crew of USAT Quinnebaug ===
On the morning of 20 July, after USAT Quinnebaug had been seriously damaged while leaving Beaufort, Anemone's commanding officer, Acting Ensign A.O. Kruge, and her executive officer, Mate George W. Briggs, commanded launches which rescued the crew and passengers—homeward-bound troops—from the doomed Army transport.

Shortly thereafter, Anemone sailed North to serve as a tug at the New York Navy Yard during the partial demobilization of the Union fleet.

== Post-war decommissioning, sale, and subsequent career ==
She was decommissioned there on 28 September 1865 and was sold at public auction on 25 October 1865. Documented Wicaco (after the Philadelphia community of the same name on 1 December 1865, the tug served American shipping until 1896.
