= USS Anemone IV =

Patrol vessel of the United States Navy

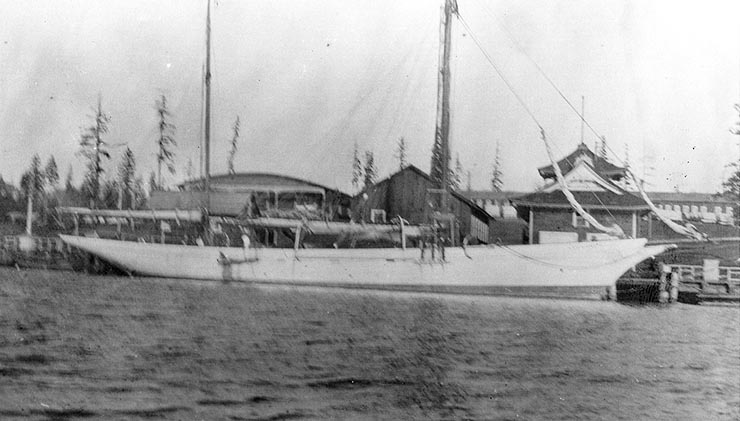
- Anemone IV as a civilian ketch-rigged motor schooner sometime between 1899 and 1917.

History

United States
- Name: USS Anemone IV; Later USS SP-1290
- Namesake: Anemone IV was her previous name retained; SP-1290 was her section patrol number
- Builder: Camper & Nicholsons, Gosport, United Kingdom
- Completed: 1899
- Acquired: 3 October 1917
- In service: 1917
- Out of service: 3 March 1919
- Stricken: 4 March 1919
- Fate: Returned to owner 4 March 1919
- Notes: Operated as civilian motor schooner Anemone IV 1899–1917 and from 1919

General characteristics
- Type: Patrol vessel
- Tonnage: 118 Gross register tons
- Length: 127 ft 0 in (38.71 m)
- Beam: 18 ft 10 in (5.74 m)
- Draft: 16 ft (4.9 m) aft
- Propulsion: Sails plus internal combustion engine
- Sail plan: Ketch-rigged
- Speed: 8 knots
- Complement: 24
- Armament: 1 × 1-pounder gun

USS Anemone IV (SP-1290) was a United States Navy patrol vessel in service from 1917 to 1919.

Anemone IV was built as a private ketch-rigged motor schooner of the same name in 1899 by Camper & Nicholsons at Gosport, United Kingdom. On 3 October 1917, the U.S. Navy acquired her at Port Townsend, Washington, under a free lease from her owner, E. A. Sims, for use as a section patrol boat during World War I. She apparently was never commissioned, but she saw active non-commissioned service as USS Anemone IV (SP-1290).

Assigned to the 13th Naval District, Anemone IV was employed to train recruits at Naval Training Station Seattle at Seattle, Washington, for over a year. At some point she was renamed USS SP-1290.

The Navy placed SP-1290 out of service on 3 March 1919. She was stricken from the Navy List and simultaneously returned to Sims on 4 March 1919.
