= United States Lighthouse Service =

Former agency of the United States government

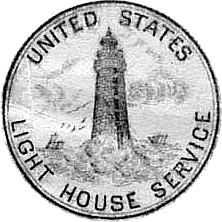
- Seal of the United States Lighthouse Service

- Pennant of the United States Lighthouse Service

Agency overview
- Formed: 1910
- Preceding agency: United States Lighthouse Board
- Dissolved: 1939
- Superseding agency: United States Coast Guard
- Jurisdiction: Federal government of the United States
- Agency executives: George R. Putnam (1910–1935), Commissioner of Lighthouses; H. D. King (1935–1939)
- Parent agency: Department of Commerce

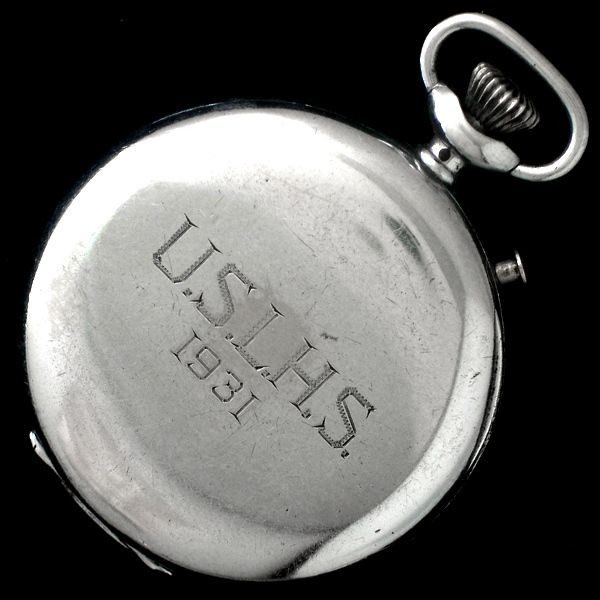
U.S. Light House Service Stop Watch (ca. 1931) – specially manufactured by the Gallet Watch Company for USLHS use.

The United States Lighthouse Service, also known as the Bureau of Lighthouses, was the agency of the United States government and the general lighthouse authority for the United States from the time of its creation in 1910 as the successor of the United States Lighthouse Board until 1939, when it was merged into the United States Coast Guard. It was responsible for the maintenance of all lighthouses and lightvessels in the United States.

== History ==
=== 1789–1910 ===
In 1789, the United States Lighthouse Establishment (USLHE) was created and operated under the Department of the Treasury. All U.S. lighthouse ownership was transferred to the government, which became the General Lighthouse Authority (GLA). In 1792, the Cape Henry Lighthouse was the first lighthouse built by the USLHE. In 1822, French physicist Augustin Fresnel designed the Fresnel lens. In 1841, the Fresnel lens was first used in the United States and installed on the Navesink Lighthouse. In 1852, the Lighthouse Board was created. In 1871, the Duxbury Pier Light became the first caisson lighthouse built in the United States. In 1877, kerosene became the primary fuel for lighthouses, replacing various fuels such as sperm oil, colza oil, rapeseed oil, and lard oil. In 1884, uniforms came into use by all members of the Lighthouse Board. In 1886, the Statue of Liberty was the first lighthouse to use electricity. In 1898, all coastal lighthouses were extinguished, for the first time in U.S. history, as a precaution during the Spanish–American War. In 1904, the Lightship Nantucket became first U.S. vessel to have radio communication. In 1910, the Bureau of Lighthouses was created and operated as the United States Lighthouse Service (USLHS).

=== 1910–1917 ===
In 1910, 11,713 aids to navigation of all types were around the country. Congress abolished the U.S. Light-House Board and created the Bureau of Lighthouses under the Department of Commerce.

The board had hired a number of civilians, and many of these experienced people took over the roles that the military officers had been playing. Though initially called inspectors, the civilian heads of the districts changed their titles to superintendent. Also at this time, the placement of aids to navigation along rivers had become the responsibility of the Lighthouse Service, and many of these aids were tended on a part-time basis by local citizens called lamp lighters and lamp attendants.

President William Taft selected George R. Putnam to head the new bureau and he gained the title "Commissioner of Lighthouses". For 25 years, Putnam headed the bureau and during his administration, navigational aids had a substantial increase. New technology was incorporated into the bureau's work, particularly in the area of electric aids and some automation using electricity. Though the number of aids to navigation increased substantially during Putnam's reign from 11,713 to about 24,000, mostly buoys and small lights, arguably two of his most significant achievements were the passage of the Retirement Act for lighthouse personnel in 1918 and the introduction in 1921 of the radio beacon as an aid to navigation. This new technology permitted a reduction of over 800 employees during Putnam's 25 years as head of the bureau.

=== World War I ===
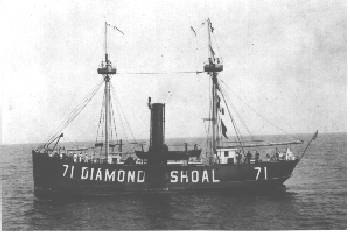
Diamond Shoal Lightship No. 71

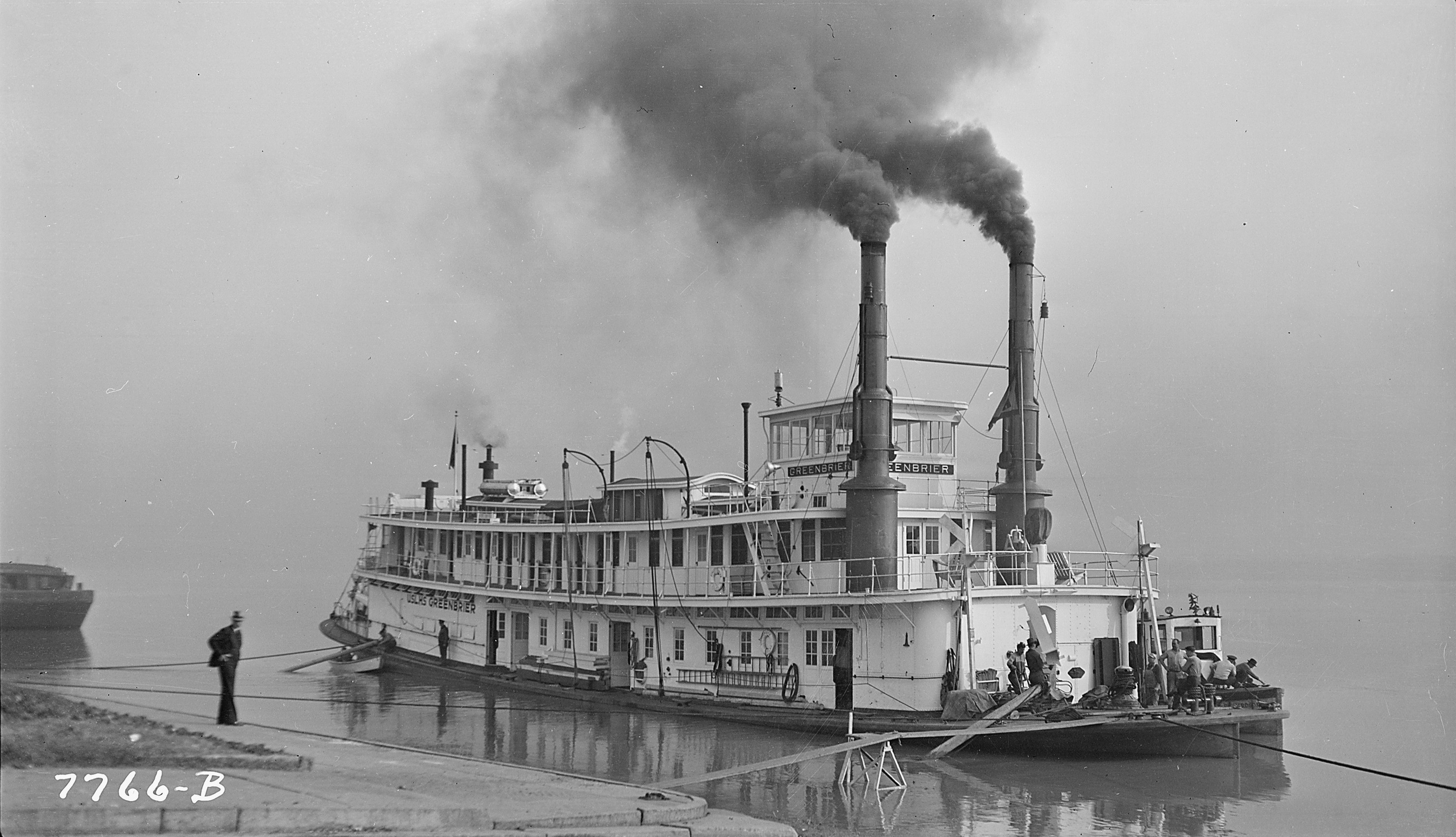
USLHS Greenbrier in 1938

During World War I and the period following, several technological advances contributed to the automation of lighthouses, rendering human occupancy unnecessary. A device for automatically replacing burned-out electric lamps in lighthouses was developed and placed in several light stations in 1916. A bell alarm warning keepers of fluctuations in the burning efficiency of oil-vapor lamps was developed in 1917. In the same year, the first experimental radio beacon was installed in a lighthouse. The only lightvessel of the service sunk by enemy action was the LV-71 on August 6, 1918. After the sinking of the SS Merak by the German submarine U-104 near Diamond Shoals, North Carolina LV-71 rescued the survivors, but was sunk, as well, shortly thereafter. Nobody was hurt in the action because the German commander allowed the Americans to evacuate the ship before firing.

=== 1919–1939 ===
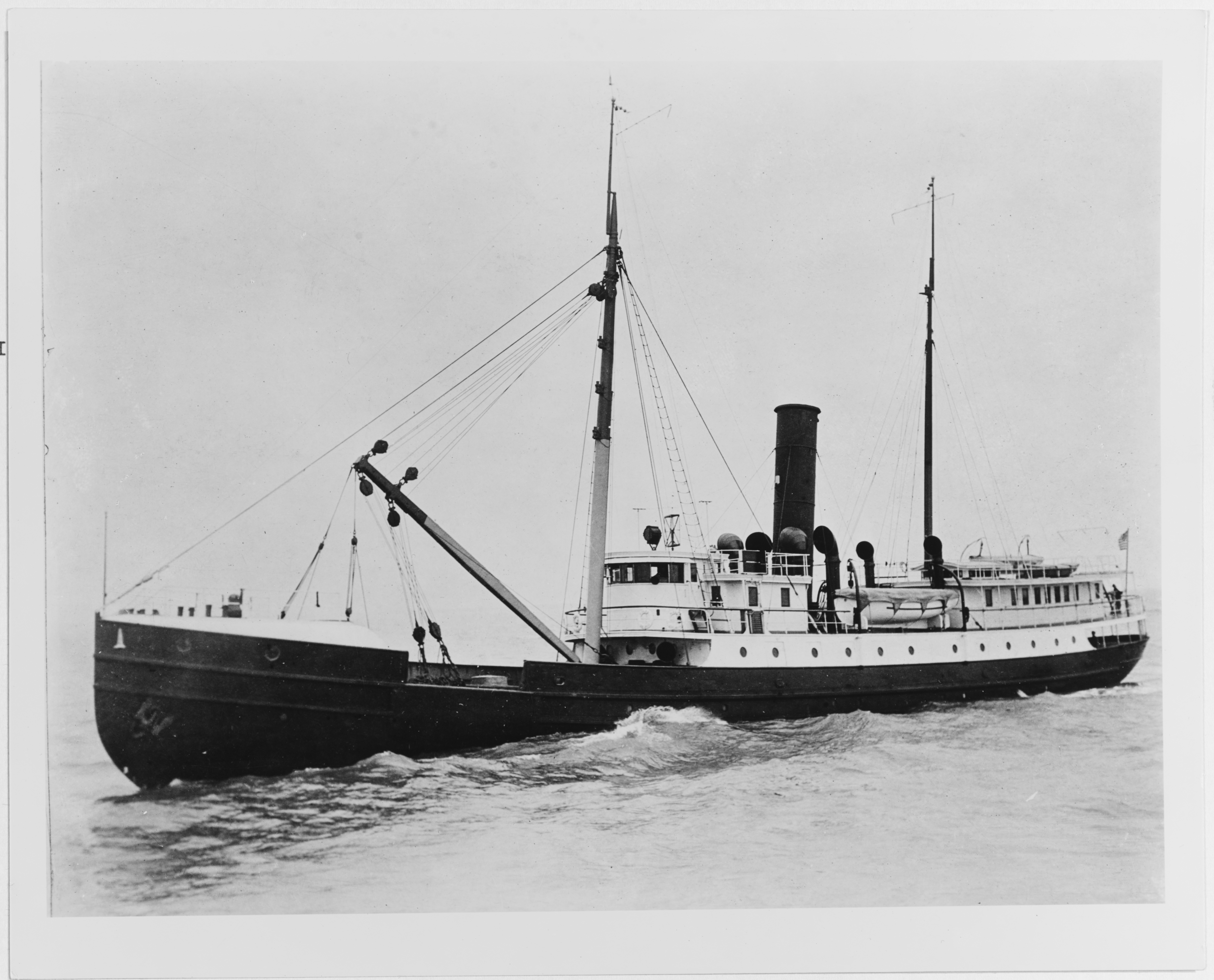
USLHS Orchid, a Manzanita-class tender, which operated in the Chesapeake Bay

The first automatic radio beacon in the United States began service in 1928. Radio beacons are still in use today, although most have recently been decommissioned as improved electronic navigational aids have become available. An automatic time clock for operating electric range lights came into use in 1926, and by 1933, a photoelectric-controlled alarm device had been developed to check the operation of the unwatched electric light. A lightship staffed by remote control was equipped by the Lighthouse Bureau in 1934. It included a light, fog signal, and radio beacon, all controlled by radio signals. A battery-powered buoy, which gradually replaced the older acetylene buoys, was introduced in 1935. Because of the technological improvements mentioned above, and in particular the radio beacon direction finder, the United States rose from sixth in shipping safety in 1920 to second in 1935, with only the Netherlands holding a better safety record.

Improvements in the road and highway systems provided better and more rapid means of transportation during the 1920s and 1930s. As a result of the improved roadways, the bureau was able to better maintain aids to navigation, benefiting the service economically. The extension of electric lines into remote sections of the country provided a reliable power source for operating aids to navigation. By the 1920s and 1930s, the majority of light stations had electric service, reducing the number of staff necessary to operate the station. As ancillary buildings at many stations, especially shore stations, were rendered useless, the makeup of the light station began to change.

In 1935, Putnam was followed in the commissioner's position by a career Lighthouse Service employee, H. D. King, a former district superintendent.

On 1 July 1939, the service merged with the United States Coast Guard, which has since taken over the maintenance and operation of all U.S. lighthouses and lightships.

== World War II ==
On March 15, 1942, the U.S. Lighthouse Service/U.S. Coast Guard tender Acacia was sunk by the German submarine U-161.

== Flags ==
All of the Lighthouse Service's lightships and lighthouse tenders flew the United States Lighthouse Service flag, a triangular flag with a red border featuring a blue lighthouse on a white background. Any Lighthouse Service ship upon which the Superintendent of Lighthouses was embarked also flew the Superintendent of Lighthouses flag, a rectangular flag with a blue border featuring the same blue lighthouse on a white background.

Pennant of a United States Lighthouse Service vessel

Flag of the Commissioner of Lighthouses

Flag of the Superintendent of Lighthouses

== Rank insignia ==
Rank insignia of officers in 1918 were:

Rank insignia	Lighthouse tenders	Lightships
Four stripes: the two outer ones one-half inch and the two inner ones one-quarter inch wide	Captain	-
Three stripes: the two outer ones one-half inch and the inner one one-quarter inch wide	Chief Engineer	-
Four stripes: one-quarter of an inch wide	Master of Tender	-
Three stripes: one-quarter inch wide	First Officer of Tender; Engineer of Tender	Master
Two stripes: one-quarter inch wide	Second Officer of Tender; First Assistant Engineer of Tender	First Mate; Engineer
One stripe: one-quarter inch wide	Third Officer of Tender; Second Assistant Engineer of Tender	Second Mate; Assistant Engineer

Rank insignia of lighthouse and depot keepers were as follows in 1884:

Rank insignia	Keepers
Letter "K" in looped rope on collar	Lighthouse Keeper
Letter "W" in looped rope on collar	Watchman
Figures "1" to "4" in looped rope on collar	First Assistant Keeper; Second Assistant Keeper; Third Assistant Keeper; Fourth Assistant Keeper

== See also ==
- Confederate States Lighthouse Bureau
- United States Coast Guard History and Heritage Sites
