= Manzanita-class tenders =

Class of 190-foot long USLHS tenders

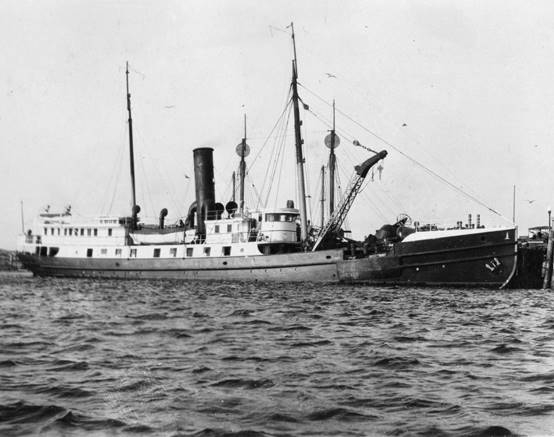
- USLHT Cypress at the South Carolina Lighthouse Service Depot in Charleston in February 1925

Class overview
- Name: Manzanita or 8
- Builders: New York Shipbuilding Company
- Operators: United States Lighthouse Service (1908–1917; 1919–1939); United States Navy (1917–1919); United States Coast Guard (1939–1945, 1946, 1947); Government of the Philippines (1945, 1946, 1947–?) (Anemone, Orchid, Sequoia, and Tulip); Various private companies
- Cost: $200,000 each
- Built: 1908
- In service: 1908–1947
- Planned: 8
- Completed: 8
- Retired: 4 (to Philippine government); 3 (to private companies)
- Scrapped: 1

General characteristics
- Type: Lighthouse and buoy tender
- Displacement: 1,081 long tons (1,098 t)
- Length: 190 ft (58 m)
- Beam: 30 ft (9.1 m)
- Draft: 13.25 ft (4.04 m)
- Installed power: 2 × triple-expansion steam engines; 2 × Scotch marine boilers (1908); 2 × Water-tube boilers (Late 1920s–early 1930s)
- Speed: 12 knots (14 mph; 22 km/h)
- Range: 2,500 mi (4,000 km)
- Boats & landing craft carried: 2

The Manzanita class, originally called the 8 class, was a class of identical tenders commissioned in 1908. They operated as lighthouse and buoy tenders throughout both World Wars. They briefly served with the United States Navy from 1917 to 1919, but served the remainder of their service with the United States Lighthouse Service (USLHS).

== History ==
A class of identical tenders was commissioned in 1908 by the United States Lighthouse Board. This class of tenders was named the 8-class, for the number of vessels commissioned, but was later named the Manzanita class after its lead ship, USLHT Manzanita. They were designed by the Department of the Navy.

The New York Shipbuilding Company of Camden, New Jersey, was assigned the task of building the tenders. They could be built for around $200,000 each. Upon their construction, the Manzanita class were the largest tenders built for the United States Lighthouse Service, save for Armeria built in 1889, and the most modern. A total of eight tenders were constructed, each named after a different plant. During World War I, the tenders were briefly transferred to the United States Navy, following an executive order signed on 11 April 1917, but were restored to the USLHS by 1919.

In the late 1920s to the early 1930s, all members of the class were upgraded with an oil-fired plant and new water-tube boilers. In 1939, the United States Lighthouse Service was merged with the United States Coast Guard. The Manzanita class were reclassified as Coast Guard Cutters and were given the prefix USCGC and new hull designations. By 1947, the entirety of the class had been either scrapped or sold. Anemone, Orchid, Sequoia, and Tulip were all transferred to the Philippines.

== Design and specifications ==
The Manzanita-class ships had a length of 190 feet (58 m), a beam of 30 feet (9.1 m), and a draft of 13.25 feet (4.04 m). They had two triple-expansion inverted direct acting steam engines, powered by two Scotch boilers, that produced 1,100 shaft horsepower (820 kW). They could reach a maximum speed of 12 knots (14 mph; 22 km/h) and go a distance of 2,500 miles (4,000 km). They had a displacement of 1,081 long tons (1,098 t).

The tenders of the class had vertical sides to reduce the tendency of buoys slipping under them as the tenders came alongside. The edges of the decks in the forecastle and buoy handling areas were rounded to prevent buoys snagging on the deck. The steel boom used wire hawsers and was "superior to its wooden predecessors." These booms were long enough to permit special rigging for transferring supplies to lighthouses on rocks or cliffs. However, the tenders heeled sharply when lifting buoys out of the water.

The superstructure was high to give a clear view over the bow and sides of the ship from the bridge, which had wings on each side and a lookout station above. A mast and boom apparatus was located just forward of the superstructure and aft of the well deck, which was accessible by breaks in the bulwarks on either side of the tender. They carried small craft for inspections and errands, which hung on davits just aft of the bridge.

== Ships ==
=== Anemone ===
USLHT Anemone was named for the genus of flowering buttercup plants. She was commissioned on 15 July 1908 and was assigned to the Eleventh Lighthouse District, operating out of San Francisco. She was transferred to the Second Lighthouse District in 1915, where she operated out of Boston and Woods Hole, Massachusetts. She was transferred to the Navy on 16 April 1917 and commissioned on 16 May. She patrolled, tended anti-submarine nets, adjusted buoys, and laid mines. She was struck from the Navy on 4 March 1919 and returned to the USLHS. During World War II, she serviced anti-submarine nets and aided in navigational duties. She was decommissioned after the war and given to the Philippine government.

=== Cypress ===
USLHT Cypress was named for an evergreen tree of the genus Cupressus. She was commissioned on 5 November 1908 and served her entire career in the Sixth Light House District, which was located off the coasts of Florida, Georgia, and South Carolina. She was transferred to the Navy on 11 April 1917 but returned to the USLHS on 10 July 1919. During World War II, she was transferred to the Sixth Naval District and based out of Charleston, South Carolina, to assist in navigational duties. She was transferred to the Tenth Naval District from 1 March to 1 July 1942, where she assisted in navigation in the Caribbean. She was decommissioned in 1946 and then sold in March 1947 to Andreadis G. Spyros and Henry C. Crowe. She was renamed Drafin by her new owners.

=== Hibiscus ===
USLHT Hibiscus was named for the plant genus Hibiscus. She was commissioned 15 June 1908 and assigned to the First Lighthouse District in Portland, Maine. She broke ice in the Kennebec River in 1918, despite not having been built as an icebreaker. A wireless set was installed in 1919. On 28 May 1942, she was badly burned and beached. She was repaired and returned to service on 16 October. She serviced anti-submarine nets and buoys at Argentia, Newfoundland, from 1944 to 1945. She was decommissioned 3 September 1946 and sold "as is" on 26 June 1947.

=== Kukui ===
USLHT Kukui was named for a Hawaiian tree. She was commissioned in August 1908 and was slated for service in California. She sailed around Cape Horn for San Francisco. Very quickly, however, her service was quickly changed to Ketchikan, Alaska, to replace USLHT Armeria, which had struck a rock and sank. After spending three years in Alaska, Kukui was transferred to the Territory of Hawaii. Following the 1941 attack on Pearl Harbor, Kukui was dispatched to the Ni'ihau to transfer a downed Japanese pilot and crewmember to O'ahu. The tender thus became the first vessel to take custody of prisoners-of-war during World War II. The tender continued to serve in Hawaii for the remainder of the war. Kukui was decommissioned on 1 February 1946, after 38 years of service, and sold for scrap the next year.

=== Manzanita ===
USLHT Manzanita was named for an evergreen shrub and was commissioned 7 June 1908. She sailed around Cape Horn for service in the Pacific coast. She was transferred to the Navy per an executive order on 11 April 1917, but was returned to the USLHS on 1 July 1919. The tender served out of Astoria, Oregon, during World War II. She laid anti-submarine cables in December 1943 off of Prince Rupert, British Columbia and Dutch Harbor, Alaska. She was decommissioned on 29 November 1946 and sold.

=== Orchid ===
USLHT Orchid was commissioned on 5 August 1908, named for the flowering plant, and was sent to Baltimore. She operated on the Chesapeake Bay, and was briefly acquired by the Navy in 1917, and served with it until 1919. She was reassigned to Norfolk, Virginia, in 1935. During World War II, she swept both the channel leading into Hampton Roads in Virginia and Cape Fear in North Carolina. The tender primarily laid buoys marking sunken ships, though on one occasion her crew picked up the corpse of a German officer and caused a stir amongst members of Navy command. Orchid was decommissioned on 1 December 1945 and sold to the Philippine government.

=== Sequoia ===
USLHT Sequoia was named for the genus of evergreen trees. She was commissioned 13 August 1908 and operated out of San Francisco for her entire career. She was operated by the Navy for the duration of World War I hostilities. She was returned to the USLHS on 1 July 1919. She was decommissioned 1 July 1946 and transferred to the Philippines in October.

=== Tulip ===
USLHT Tulip was named for the genus of bulbous plants. She was commissioned 14 July 1908 and operated out of St. George, Staten Island. She was operated by the Navy for the duration of hostilities in World War I, and was returned to the USLHS on 1 July 1919. During World War II, she was assigned to the Third Naval District to aid with navigational duties. She was decommissioned on 1 December 1945 and turned over to the Philippines.
