= Acero (disambiguation) =

Acero (born 1984) is a Mexican luchador enmascarado.

Acero may also refer to:

== People ==
- Amós Acero (1893–1941), Spanish politician
- Esthela Acero (born 1984), Ecuadorian politician
- Nestor Acero (died 1972), Philippine Medal of Valor recipient
- Vicente Acero (1675/1680–1739), Spanish architect

== Other uses ==
- CD Acero, a Spanish football team
- Kid Acero, a line of action figure toys
- Monte Acero, a mountain in Italy
- Señora Acero, an American telenovela (2014–2019)

== See also ==
- Hermán Aceros (1938–2018), Colombian footballer
