= BRP Nestor Acero =

Philippine gunboat

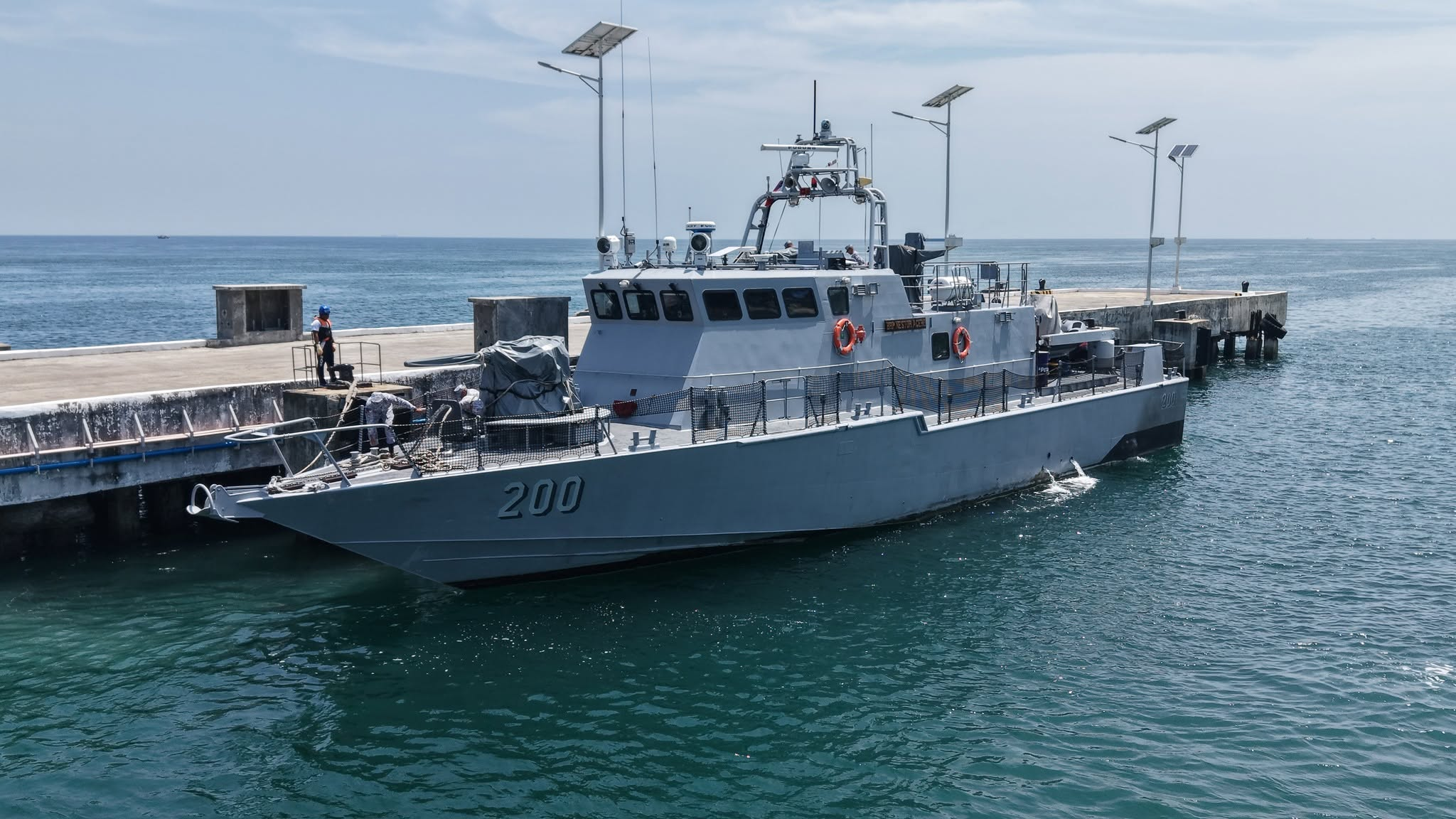
- BRP Nestor Acero (PG-200), bearing new pennant number after previously classified as PG-901.

History

Philippines
- Name: BRP Nestor Acero
- Namesake: Private First Class Nestor Acero, PN (Marines), Philippine Medal of Valor Awardee
- Builder: Israel Shipyards Ltd.
- Launched: 26 June 2022
- Acquired: 06 September 2022
- Commissioned: 28 November 2022
- Status: in active service
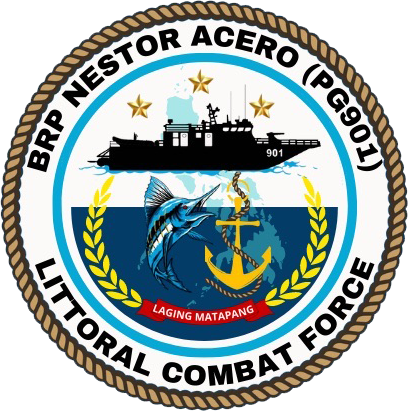
- Badge

General characteristics
- Class & type: Acero-class gunboat
- Displacement: 95 tons full load
- Length: 32.65 m (107 ft 1 in)
- Beam: 6.2 m (20 ft 4 in) max
- Draft: 0.38 m (1.25 ft)
- Propulsion: 2 × MTU 16V 4000 M70 diesel engines; 2 x MJP-J650 waterjets
- Speed: greater than 40 knots (74 km/h) maximum
- Range: 1,000 nmi (1,900 km) at 15 knots (28 km/h)
- Complement: 12
- Sensors & processing systems: Furuno Navnet 3D X-band navigation/surface search radar; Rafael Toplite electro-optical tracking system (EOTS)
- Armament: 1 x Rafael Typhoon MLS-NLOS missile launcher for 8 x Spike-NLOS surface-to-surface missiles (fitted for but not with); 1 × Mk.44 Bushmaster II autocannon mounted on Rafael Typhoon Mk 30-C remote-controlled weapon station; 2 × M2HB Browning 12.7 mm/50 cal. heavy machine guns mounted on Rafael Mini Typhoon remote-controlled weapon stations; 2 × M60 7.62 mm/30 cal. GP machine guns

BRP Nestor Acero (PG-200, formerly PG-901) is lead ship of the Acero-class patrol gunboats of the Philippine Navy. She was commissioned with the Philippine Navy on 28 November 2022 and is currently in active service with the Littoral Combat Force, Philippine Fleet.

== Namesake ==
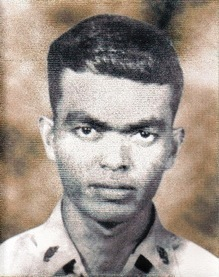

Private First Class Nestor F. Acero, PN (Marines) was an enlisted Marine of the Philippine Marine Corps and a recipient the Philippines' highest military award for courage, the Medal of Valor.

Acero was assigned as rifleman in the 7th Marine Company in Jolo, Sulu on 26–27 November 1972 when his company along with the 8th Marine Company assaulted a hill defended by approximately 500 Moro rebels. The marines encountered heavy resistance and took casualties. A withdrawal was eventually ordered from Battalion level. Acero however, was nursing a wounded comrade and elected to cover the withdrawal of the rest of his unit. He was killed in action.

== History ==
In 2019, the Philippine Navy raised a requirement to procure a new class of coastal patrol interdiction craft (CPIC) that would be missile-capable and are based on Israel's Shaldag V patrol boat design, and would replace the Tomas Batilo-class fast attack crafts that have been retired in service.

A contract was signed between the (DND), Israel Shipyards Ltd. and Israeli Ministry of Defense on 9 February 2021, with the Notice to Proceed to start the effectivity of the contract released on 27 April 2021.

The first boat of the class, the Nestor Acero (901), was launched on 26 June 2022, and became the basis for the class' name. The boat arrived in the Philippines together with its sistership Lolinato To-ong (PG-902) in early September 2022, and was christened as the BRP Nestor Acero (PG-901) on 6 September 2022. Both boats were commissioned with the Philippine Navy on 28 November 2022 and was assigned with the Littoral Combat Force. These were the first two ships delivered and commissioned out of nine initial Fast Attack Interdiction Crafts ordered by the Philippine Navy for this project.

The hull number's use of "PG" indicates that the boats are classified as Patrol Gunboats based on Philippine Navy's 2016 naming classification standards.

== Design ==
=== Armament ===
The ship class was designed to carry one bow-mounted Mk.44 Bushmaster II autocannon mounted on Rafael Typhoon Mk 30-C remote-controlled weapon station, and two M2HB Browning 12.7 mm/50-cal. heavy machine guns mounted on Rafael Mini Typhoon remote-controlled weapon stations.

It is also one of the few ships of the class that did not have a Rafael Typhoon MLS-NLOS missile launcher for Spike-NLOS surface-to-surface missiles upon its commissioning, although the boat was fitted for the missile launcher there are plans to integrate such weapon in the future.

== Operational deployments ==
The Nestor Acero was deployed to the Naval Forces Western Mindanao Command's area of responsibility and arrived Ensign Majini Pier, Naval Station Romulo Espaldon in Zamboanga City on December 08, 2022.

== Gallery ==
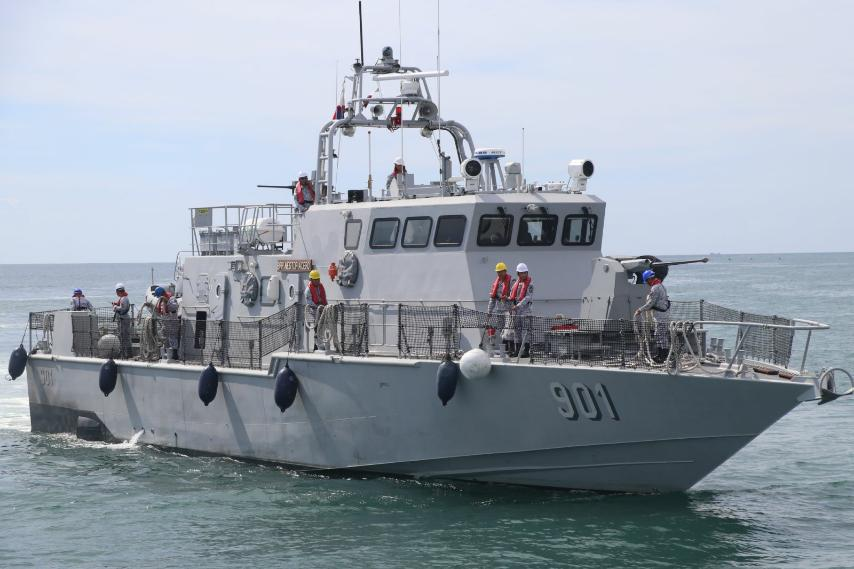
BRP Nestor Acero (PG-901)

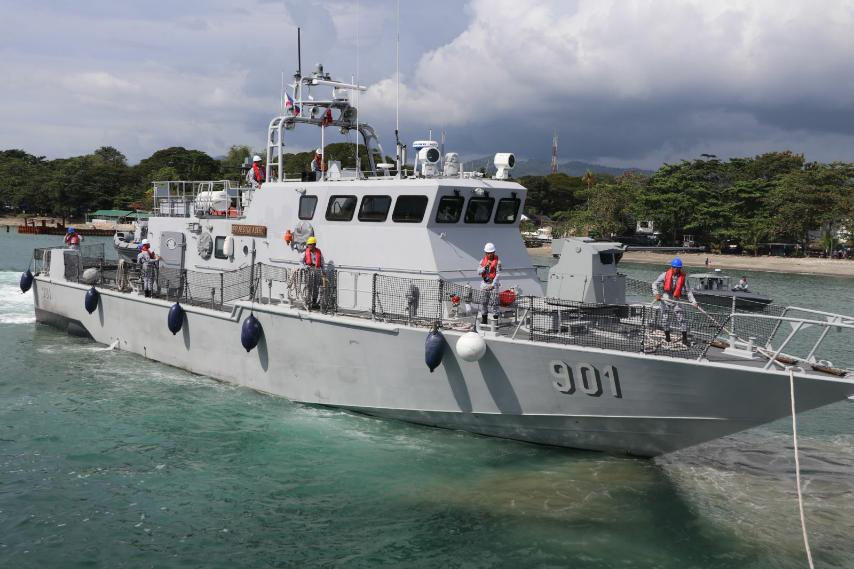
BRP Nestor Acero (PG-901) as it arrives at Naval Forces Western Mindanao headquarters in Zamboanga City.

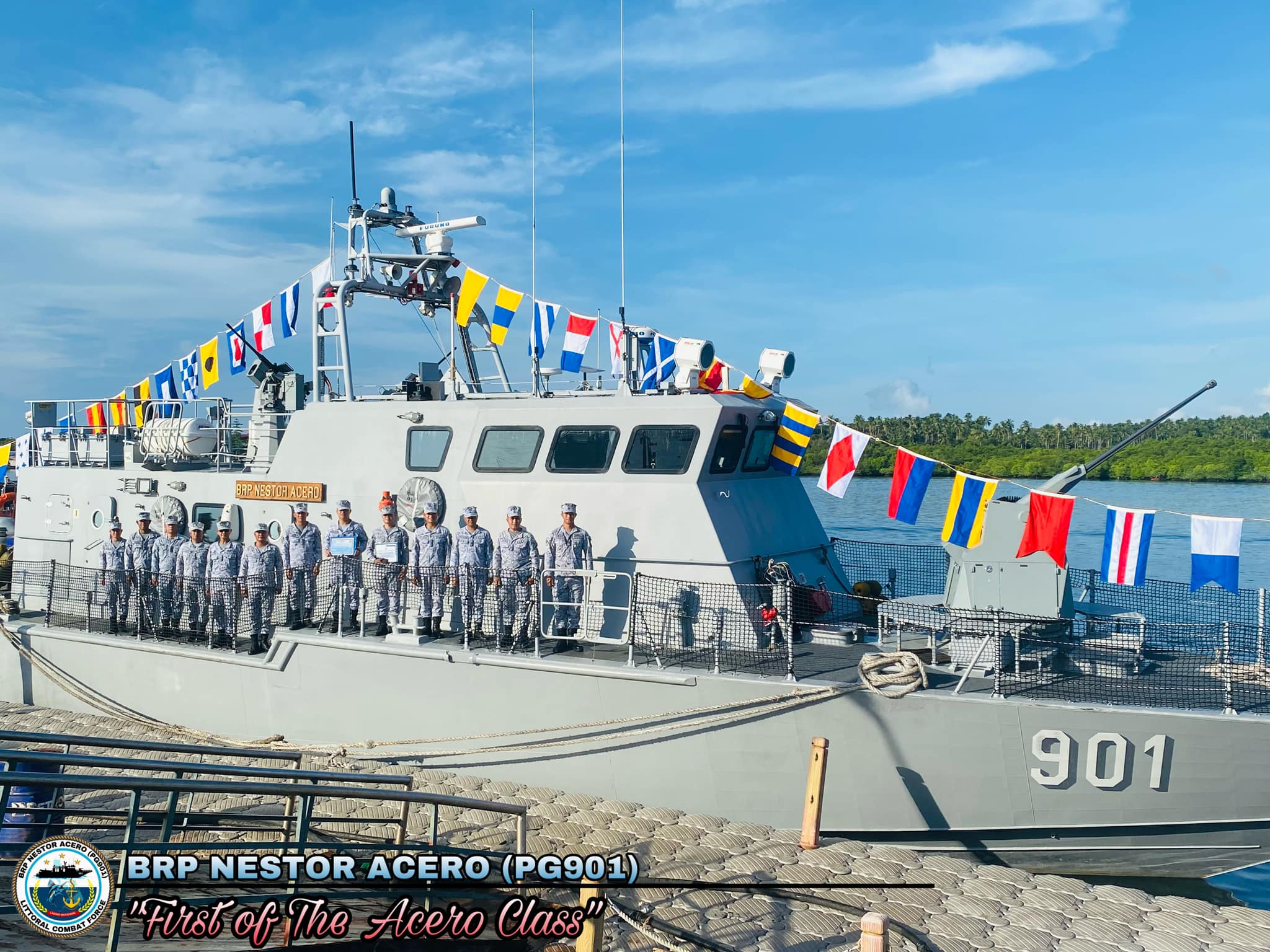
BRP Nestor Acero in its first year in active service.
