= BRP Dionisio Ojeda =

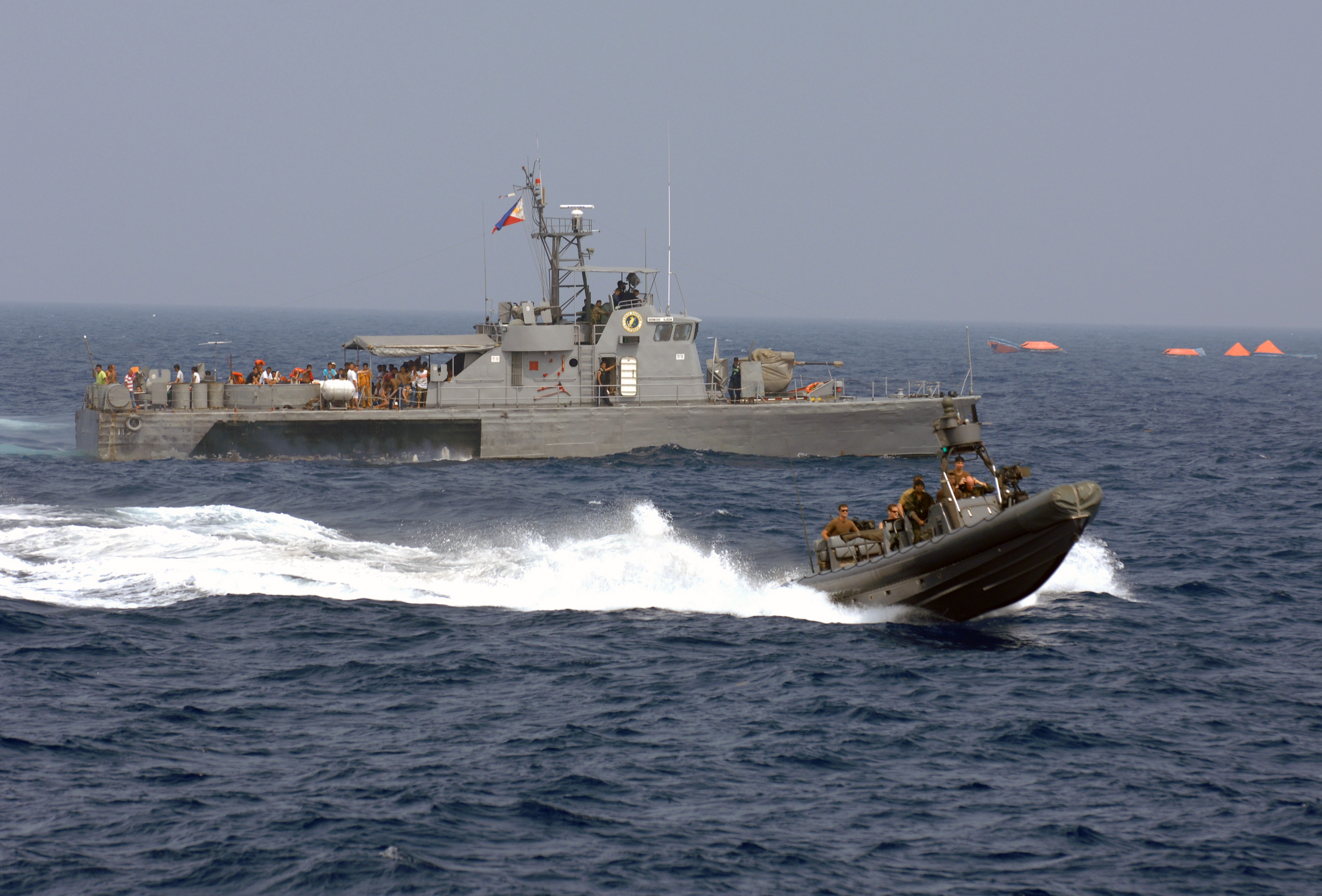
- BRP Dionisio Ojeda (PC-117)

History

South Korea
- Name: PKM-232
- Builder: Korea Tacoma Shipyard, Chinhae, South Korea
- Launched: 1970s
- Fate: transferred to Philippine Navy in 2006

History

Philippines
- Name: BRP Dionisio Ojeda (PC-117)
- Namesake: Dionisio Ojeda
- Operator: Philippine Navy
- Acquired: 2006
- Commissioned: 2007
- Decommissioned: June 2016
- Reclassified: April 2016, from PG-117 to PC-117
- Status: Decommissioned in 2016, sunk as target in 2018

General characteristics
- Class & type: Tomas Batilo class (Chamsuri Wildcat PKM class)
- Type: Fast Attack Craft
- Displacement: 148 tons full load
- Length: 121.4 ft (37 m)
- Beam: 22.6 ft (7 m)
- Draft: 5.6 ft (1.7 m)
- Propulsion: 2 × MTU MD 16V 538 TB90 diesel engines @ 6,000 hp, 2 shafts
- Speed: 32 knots (59 km/h) max
- Range: 600 nautical miles (1,100 km) at 20 knots
- Boats & landing craft carried: 1 × Motorized Rubber Boat
- Complement: 31
- Sensors & processing systems: Furuno type navigation and surface search radar
- Armament: 1 × Bofors 40 mm naval gun; 2 × Oerlikon 20mm guns; 4 × 50-caliber Machine Guns

BRP Dionisio Ojeda (PC-117) was a Tomas Batilo-class fast attack craft of the Philippine Navy. It was part of the second batch transferred by the South Korean government in 2006. It was formally commissioned with the Philippine Navy in 2007.

From 6 September 2009, the ship took part in rescue and search & rescue operations for survivors from the sinking of SuperFerry 9 off the coast of Zamboanga del Norte.

The ship took part in the Exercise SEACAT 2011 between Philippine and US navies as part of Naval Task Force 61 between 14 and 24 of June 2011.

In April 2016, in line with the Philippine Navy Standard Operating Procedures #08, the boat was reclassified as the patrol craft BRP Dionisio Ojeda (PC-117).

Two months later in June 2016, PC-117 was retired from service after 9 years of service and struck off the Philippine Navy ship register.

On the 21st of November 2018 the Ship was sunk as a target by the Philippine Navy's MPAC weapon system along with two target boxes as part of the Navy's weapon demonstration of SPIKE ER.

== Gallery ==
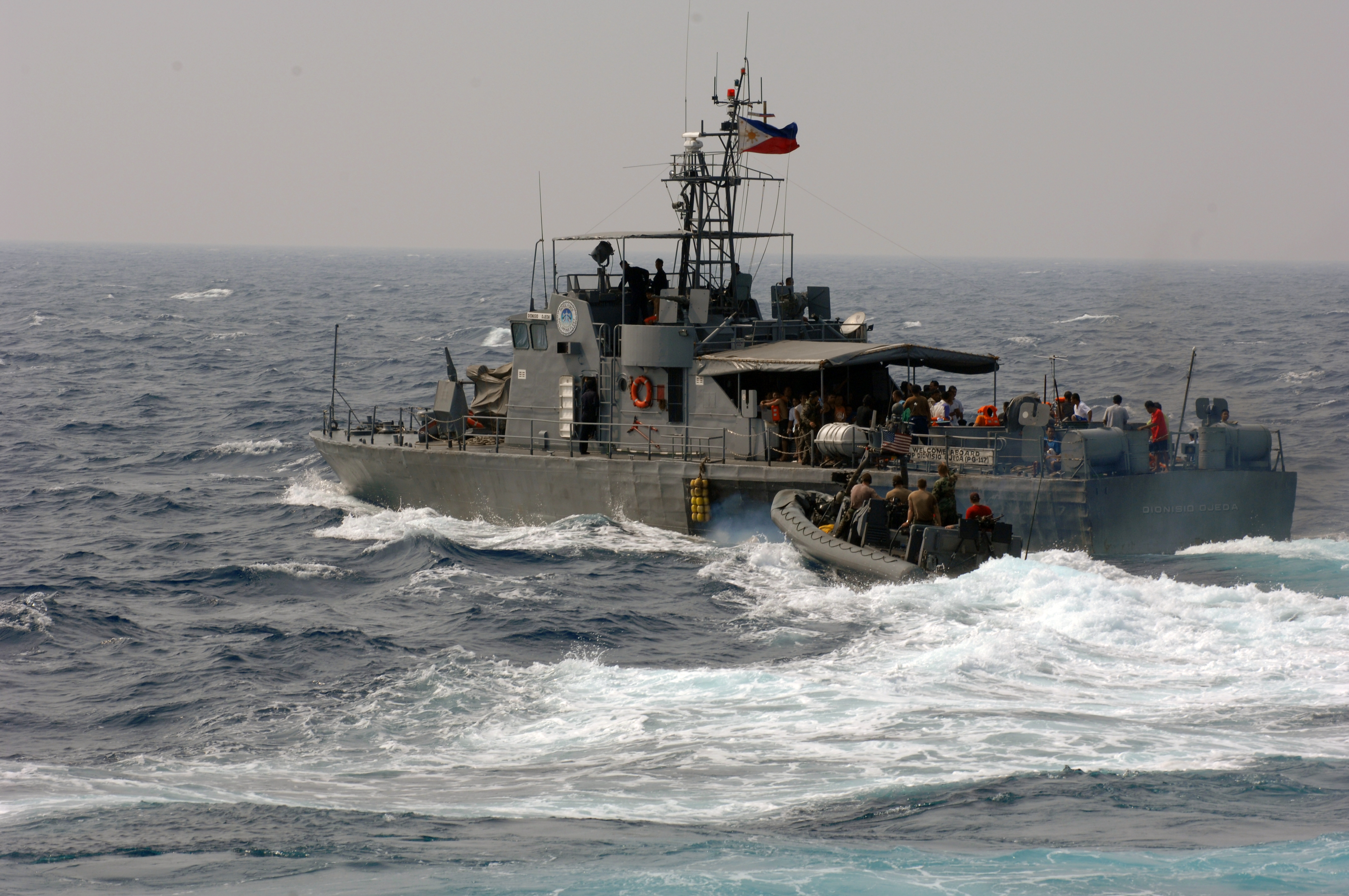
BRP Dionisio Ojeda (PG-117) during search & rescue operations for survivors from the sinking of SuperFerry 9.

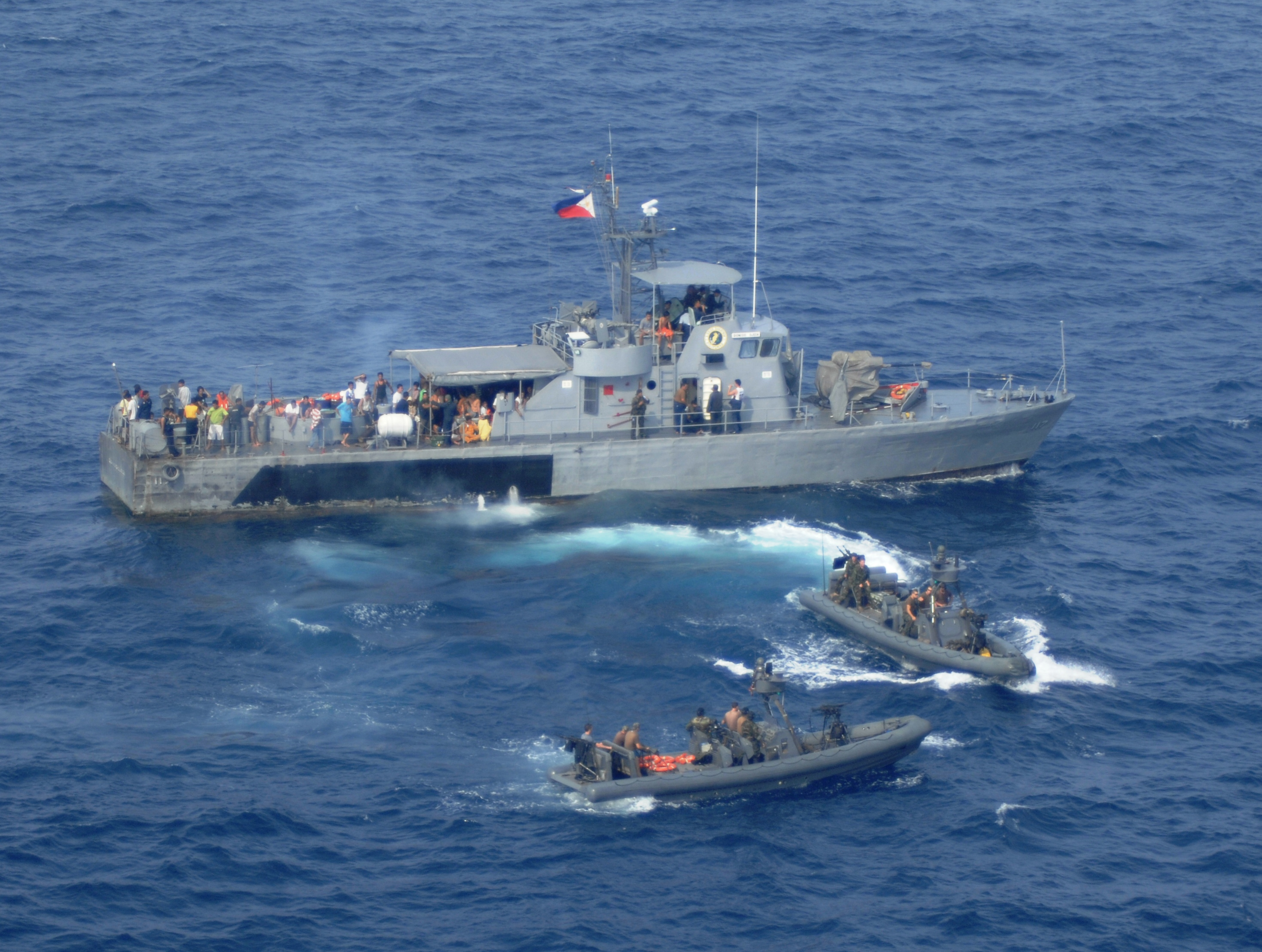
BRP Dionisio Ojeda (PG-117) with two rigid hull inflatable boats operated by the members of U.S. Joint Special Operations Task Force–Philippines (JSOTF-P)

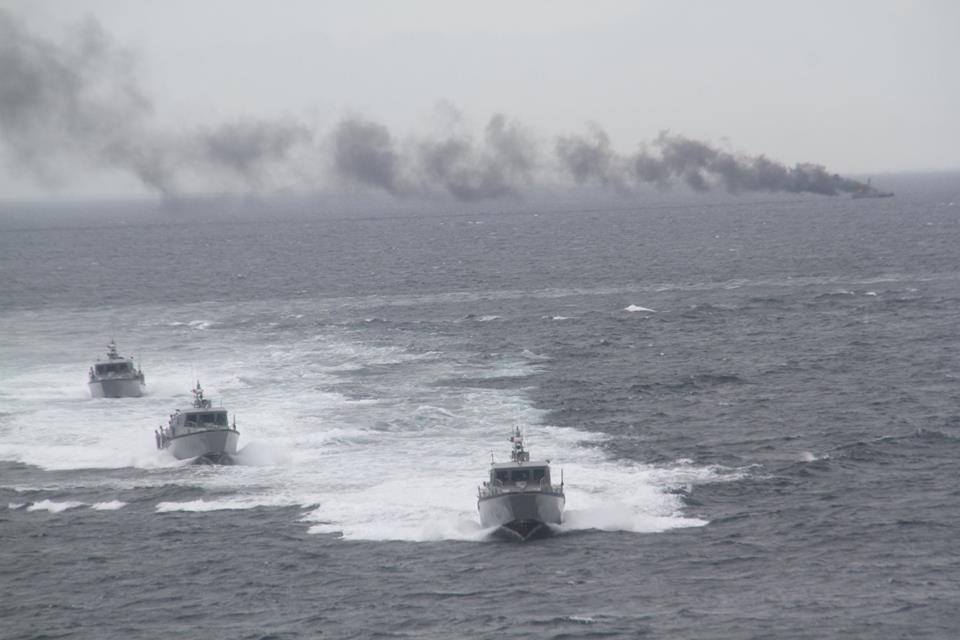
The hulk of the retired fast attack craft BRP Dionisio Ojeda (PC-117) burns after being hit by a Spike-ER missile launched from an MPAC Mk. III attack boat during a live fire demonstration held in November 2018 off the coast of Bataan.
