= BRP Salvador Abcede =

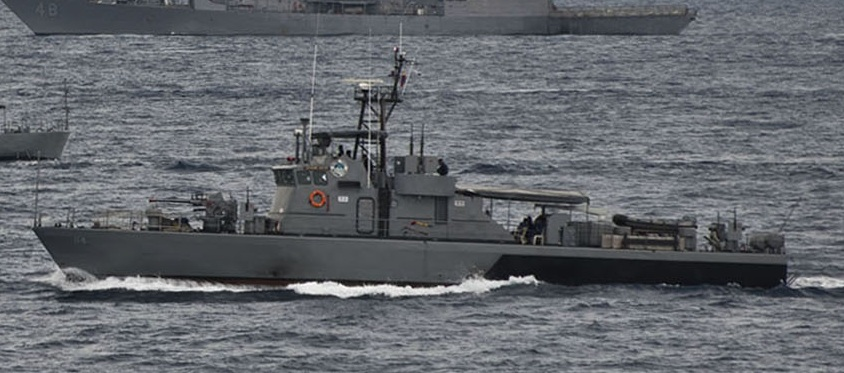
- BRP Salvador Abcede (PC-114)

History

South Korea
- Name: PKM-231
- Builder: Korea Tacoma Shipyard, Chinhae, South Korea
- Launched: 1970s
- Fate: transferred to Philippine Navy in 1995

History

Philippines
- Name: BRP Salvador Abcede (PC-114)
- Operator: Philippine Navy
- Acquired: 15 June 1995
- Commissioned: 22 May 1996
- Decommissioned: 1 March 2021
- Reclassified: April 2016, from PG-114 to PC-114
- Fate: Decommissioned

General characteristics
- Class & type: Tomas Batilo class (Chamsuri Wildcat PKM class)
- Type: Fast Attack Craft
- Displacement: 148 tons full load
- Length: 121.4 ft (37 m)
- Beam: 22.6 ft (7 m)
- Draft: 5.6 ft (1.7 m)
- Propulsion: 2 × Caterpillar 3516C diesel engines (from 2008) @ 6,300 hp, 2 shafts
- Speed: 33 knots (61 km/h) max
- Range: 600 nautical miles (1,100 km) at 20 knots
- Boats & landing craft carried: 1 × Rigid Hull Inflatable Boat
- Complement: 31
- Sensors & processing systems: Koden MDC 1500 navigation and surface search radar
- Armament: 1 × Bofors Mark 3 40mm/60 caliber gun; 2 × Oerlikon Mark 4 20mm/70 caliber guns; 4 × Browning M2HB .50 caliber heavy machine guns

BRP Salvador Abcede (PC-114) was a Tomas Batilo-class fast attack craft of the Philippine Navy. It was part of the first batch transferred by the South Korean government on 15 June 1995, and arrived in the Philippines in August 1995. It was commissioned with the Philippine Navy on 22 May 1996.

== History ==
It was upgraded under the Patrol Killer Medium-Republic of the Philippines (PKM-RP) Program of 2010 by Propmech Corp., the program includes the reinforcement of its hull, replacing the engines, radar, navigation and communication systems, and changing the weapons fit-out to include crane and space for rubber boats.

The ship was part of the Philippine Navy contingent during the US-Philippines CARAT 2012 sea-phase exercises.

In April 2016, in line with the Philippine Navy Standard Operating Procedures #08, the boat was reclassified as the patrol craft BRP Salvador Abcede (PC-114), and was assigned with the Littoral Combat Force, Philippine Fleet.

The ship was retired from service on 1 March 2021 after 24 years of service with the Philippine Navy.

On January 27, 2024, a bid was launched by the Bureau of Fisheries and Aquatic Resources to repair and refurbish the ship.

== Technical details ==
The ship was originally powered by 2 MTU MD 16V 538 TB90 diesel engines with total output of 6,000 horsepower. From 2011, Propmech was contracted to replace the old engines with new Caterpillar 3516C diesel engines with a total output of 6,300 horsepower.

The ship was equipped with a Koden Electronics MDC 1500 Series navigation and surface search radar, which replaced the previously installed radar during the refurbishing works in 2007.

== Gallery ==
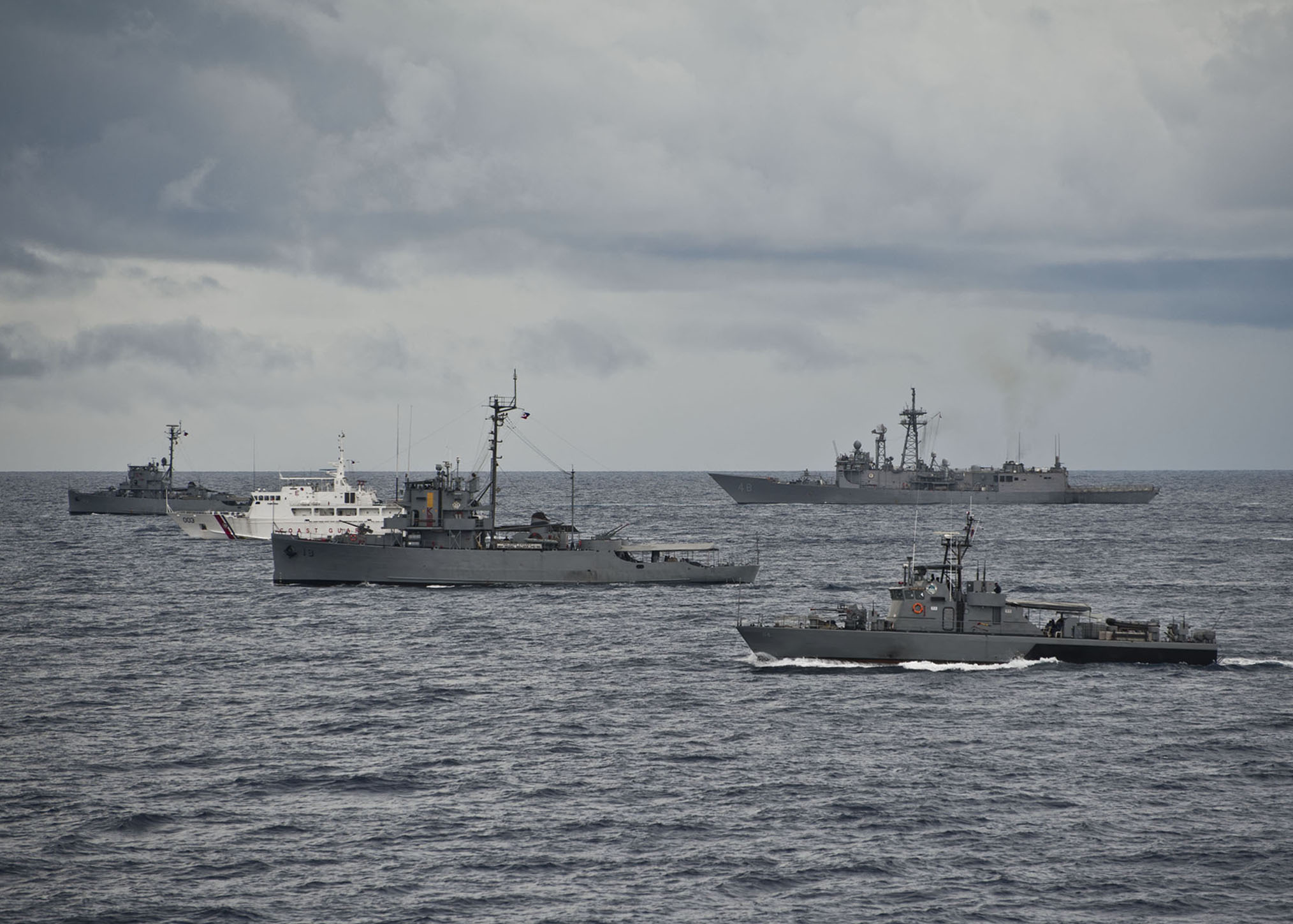
BRP Salvador Abcede with other US and Philippine ships at CARAT Philippines 2012
