= BRP Tomas Batilo =

History

South Korea
- Name: PKM 225
- Fate: transferred to Philippine Navy in August 1995.

History

Philippines
- Name: Tomas Batilo
- Namesake: Tomas Batilo was a Philippine Army officer who served during the Korean War with the Philippine Expeditionary Forces To Korea (PEFTOK)
- Operator: Philippine Navy
- Acquired: August 1995
- Commissioned: 22 May 1996
- Decommissioned: 8 January 2003
- Fate: Decommissioned and sold as scrap

General characteristics
- Type: Patrol Craft
- Displacement: 113 tons
- Speed: 38 knots (70 km/h) max

BRP Tomas Batilo (PG-110) was the lead ship of Tomas Batilo class patrol craft of the Philippine Navy. It was part of the first batch transferred by the South Korean government on 15 June 1995, and arrived in the Philippines in August 1995. It was commissioned with the Philippine Navy on 22 May 1996.

She sank during a typhoon in 2003, and was salvaged in 2009 in a joint operation between Mobile Diving and Salvage Unit One Company 1-4 out of Naval Station Pearl Harbor and Philippine Navy divers. The salvage took just over 18 hours of bottom-time diving, and a total of six days to complete the project.

== Technical details ==
The vessel has a displacement of 170 tons fully loaded, a length overall of length is 121.4 feet (37.0 m), and a top speed of 38 knots (70 km/h; 44 mph). Its range is 50 miles (80 km) at 32 knots or 1,000 miles (1,600 km) at 20 knots. The craft is armed with a 1-twin 30mm Emerson Electric gun mount, a Bofors 40mm/60, and either 2 Oerlikon 20mm(twin mount) or 2 20mm General Electric Sea Vulcan Gatling Guns.
