= BRP Emilio Liwanag =

History

South Korea
- Name: PKM-223
- Builder: Korea Tacoma
- Launched: 1970s
- Fate: transferred to Philippine Navy in 2006

History

Philippines
- Name: BRP Emilio Liwanag (PC-118)
- Namesake: Capt. Emilio S. Liwanag, (PN). WWII, Korean War veteran and US Legion of Merit awardee
- Operator: Philippine Navy
- Acquired: 30 May 2006
- Commissioned: 15 April 2011
- Decommissioned: 1 March 2021
- Reclassified: April 2016, from PG-118 to PC-118
- Fate: Decommissioned

General characteristics
- Class & type: Tomas Batilo class (Chamsuri Wildcat PKM class)
- Type: Fast Attack Craft
- Displacement: 148 tons full load
- Length: 121.4 ft (37 m)
- Beam: 22.6 ft (7 m)
- Draft: 5.6 ft (1.7 m)
- Propulsion: 2 × Caterpillar 3516C diesel engines @ 6,300 hp, 2 shafts
- Speed: 31 knots (57 km/h) max
- Range: 600 nautical miles (1,100 km) at 20 knots
- Boats & landing craft carried: 1 × Rigid Hull Inflatable Boat
- Complement: 31
- Sensors & processing systems: Koden Electronics MDC 1500 series navigation and surface search radar
- Armament: 1 × Bofors Mark 3 40mm/60 caliber gun; 2 × Oerlikon Mark 4 20mm/70 caliber guns; 4 × Browning M2HB .50 caliber heavy machine guns

BRP Emilio Liwanag (PC-118) was a Tomas Batilo class fast attack craft of the Philippine Navy. It was part of the last batch of such craft transferred to the Philippines by the South Korean government in 2006. After 2 years of refurbishing, refitting and upgrade, the ship was commissioned into active service by the Philippine Navy on 15 April 2011, although it was presented to the public as early as May 2010 during the 112th Anniversary of the Philippine Navy.

It was upgraded under the Patrol Killer Medium-Republic of the Philippines (PKM-RP) Program of 2008 by Propmech Corporation; the upgrade included the reinforcement of its hull; replacing the engines, radar, navigation and communication systems; and changing the weapons fit-out to include a crane and space for rubber boats. The upgrades were completed in 2010.

In April 2016, in line with the Philippine Navy Standard Operating Procedures #08, the boat was reclassified as the patrol craft BRP Emilio Liwanag (PC-118), and was assigned with the Littoral Combat Force, Philippine Fleet.

The ship was retired from service on 1 March 2021 after over 9 years of service with the Philippine Navy. PC-118 and PC-114 (BRP Salvador Abcede) were the last two remaining Tomas Batilo-class patrol craft to be finally retired and struck off the Philippine Navy register during the decommission ceremony.

== Technical details ==
The ship was originally powered by two MTU MD 16V 538 TB90 diesel engines with a total output of 6,000 horsepower. The refurbishment works replaced the old engines with new Caterpillar 3516C diesel engines, with a total output of 6,300 horsepower.

The ship is equipped with a Koden Electronics MDC 1500 Series navigation and surface search radar, which replaced the previously installed radar.

== See also ==
- Philippine Navy
- List of decommissioned ships of the Philippine Navy
