= Big Jim (toy line) =

Mattel action figure line

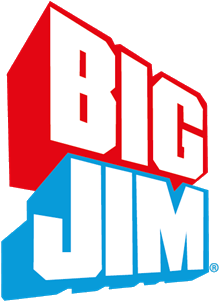
- Product type: Action figure
- Current owner: Mattel
- Introduced: 1972
- Discontinued: 1986; 40 years ago
- Related brands: G.I. Joe

Big Jim is a brand of an action figure line produced from 1972 through 1986 by Mattel for the North American and European markets. He was renamed "Kid Acero" in Latin America and, for a short period of time, "Mark Strong" (not to be confused with the actor) in Europe. Originally inspired by G.I. Joe, the Big Jim line was smaller in size (closer to 10 inches in height compared to Joe's 12) and each figure included a push button in the back that made the character execute a karate chop action. The action figure's arms were made of a soft plastic/vinyl material and contained a mechanism that simulated the bulge of a biceps when the elbow was bent.

Big Jim was less military-oriented than the G.I. Joe line, having more of a secret agent motif, but also had a large variety of outfits and situations available including sports, space exploration, martial arts, hunting, western, camping, fishing, and photography.

== Basic characters ==
Characters are sorted in the year in which they made their first appearance. Most of them were produced for several years after their initial release.

=== Original Mark Strong the Man from Mattel (1972) ===
- Mark Strong (Big Jim's conceptual source): The basic figure was dressed in orange shorts with white stripes and came with a karate board, dumbbell and test of strength belt. He was only released in Europe.

=== Original Big Jim Basic series (1972) ===
- Big Jim is the basic good guy leader of the P.A.C.K. He was an average Caucasian male with few distinguishable characteristics, except having a permanent good attitude and joy for life.
- Big Jack is one of the first African American characters with friendly attitude that made it into toys without racial stereotypes.
- Big Josh is effectively Big Jim with a beard. He is one of Jim's best friends, and was positioned as the tough guy among the group.
- Big Jeff is Big Jim's third buddy. He is an Australian blond, who was also Jim's opponent in the Olympic boxing match set, even though both Jim and Jeff are on the American team.
- Dr. Steel came with a steel right hand and an iron pipe, and a large dragon tattoo on his chest. Originally a villain, he later appeared as a member of the P.A.C.K., but in some countries he remained a villain.
- Chief Tankua is Jim's Native American friend. He came with bow and arrow, and was the first character to wear the wolf tattoo which became the P.A.C.K. logo.

=== P.A.C.K. series (1976) ===
- Warpath: Exactly the same figure as Tankua, but with a different name.
- The Whip is a master of all weapons. He came with boomerangs, bo staff, bola and whip, from which he takes his codename. The Whip is one of the few Big Jim characters known by an alias instead of his real name.
- Torpedo Fist is probably the strangest of all members of the P.A.C.K., and was the only one who had superpowers. While all other members of the group were normal humans, Torpedo has a telescopic cybernetic arm.
- Zorak is a scientist who performed several genetic experiments on his own body, until he became a menace. He was the villain in the P.A.C.K. series.

=== Spy series (1982) ===
- Agent 004: Big Jim, with a new secret identity.
- Joe is a professional alpinist who helps agent 004.
- Professor O.B.B. is an Asian gentlemen with refined moods and a dangerous profession. His character was partially based on James Bond's character Doctor No.
- Boris was inspired by Oddjob from Goldfinger. He has a steel cap on his skull and a fist which could extend from his wrist with a cable.

=== Global Command series (1985) ===
- Commander Jim: Big Jim, this time as the leader of an adventure team, similar to the original P.A.C.K., but oriented to spy and space adventures.
- Astros is described as a loyal friend of Jim. He was initially dressed as an astronaut.
- Dr. Alec is a member of Global Command specializing in jungle and desert missions.
- Baron Fangg is a longtime enemy and rival of Doctor Alec. He was equipped with a "mimetic armor" which allowed him to mimic the area around him like a chameleon.
- Vektor is a cosmonaut specializing in supersonic aircraft and was intended to be Astros's rival.

== The Original Edition ==
First Editions: Originally, Big Jim action figures came out in a small blue box with red and white stripes. The 1972 toyline was split into three sub lines: the Basic Line, the Adventure Line and the Sports Line. Simultaneously, Mattel released an almost identical figure named Mark Strong, The Man from Mattel© in Europe. The Mark Strong figure was nearly identical to Big Jim and came with the same accessories. The crotch piece of the Mark Strong figure was thinner and more fragile than that of Big Jim.

The basic line was composed mostly of figures which came almost naked, with minimal clothes or accessories. The original basic Big Jim came dressed in orange shorts with white stripes and included a karate board, a dumbbell and test of strength belt. Jack was an identical figure, with only a different head. He was one of the first toys produced in the United States to represent a minority character in a respectful way.

The Basic line also included the first incarnations of Josh and Jeff. Jeff is an Aussie type figure dressed with shorts and brown hat that came with a chopping knife, a chest belt and a bamboo stand. Josh is a bearded woodsman figure fully dressed in denim vest and shorts with brown boots. He was the only one which came with vest and shoes.

All four basic figures had a mechanism that simulated the bulge of a biceps when the arm was bent.

The adventure series was composed mostly of camping and explorer vehicles, and these were the first playsets in the toyline. Three animals were released with this first wave: a gorilla, a rhino and a crocodile.

The sports line was composed of different versions of Big Jim. He was a baseball player, a hockey player, a pugilist, and an eagle ranger. The eagle which came with this set was also included with several later versions of Big Jim.

The first wave of Big Jim also included a figure dressed as a nuclear plant worker, which had no relation to any other figures in the line.

== P.A.C.K. Series ==
In 1975, Mattel decided to create an extension of the main toy line making Big Jim the leader of a Mission Impossible-like group of heroes for hire. This series is easy to identify because all related products have a howling wolf as its principal image and character art by Jack Kirby. The members of the spy group were named P.A.C.K., which is an acronym derived from "Professional Agents – Crime Killers".

On its initial release, the series presented Jim as "Commander", this time as the leader of a counter intelligence strike team. He and two of his most loyal friends join forces against a hooded villain known as "Zorak, the ruler of the Underworld".

The first Zorak action figure was named Double Trouble Zorak, because he had a face-changing feature where his normal-looking head could be turned into a monstrous green visage.

Two Big Jim action figures were relaunched to join forces against Zorak. One of them was Warpath (a Native American archer) who was previously released as Tankua. The main reason for the name change was the difficulty in pronouncing "Tankua" properly, and the need for a more dynamic name. Dr. Steel returned too, but this time as a hero and member of the P.A.C.K. A new character was added to the group, The Whip, a weapons specialist armed with a bullwhip. One year later, a new character named Torpedo Fist (a former sailor with an artificial hand and forearm) was added to the team. In Latin America several parts of this figure in particular were split to create new Big Jim characters not released in the United States, as part of the region's version of P.A.C.K., named LOBO Squadron.

- Big Jim Commander / with wolfpack tattoo on left hand / dressed in white pants – blue sweater with white wolfpack logo – shoulderholster and silver gun – brown boots – wolfpack belt – silver arm communicator for right arm.
- Big Jim Gold Commander / with wolfpack tattoo on left hand / dressed in yellow pants – black sweater with gold wolfpack logo – shoulderholster with silver gun – black boots – wolfpack belt – silver arm communicator for right arm.
- Double Trouble Big Jim / with wolf pack tattoo on left hand / He had solid hair which looked more like a helmet, as his face would change much like the Double Trouble Zorak, but Big Jim would change from a normal face to an angry face.
- Torpedo Fist / with wolfpack tattoo on left hand / dressed in blue pants – red + black striped shirt – blue hat – brown boots – wolfpack belt / came with expanding right arm, torpedo fist action.
- The Whip / with wolfpack tattoo on left hand /figure with Black hair and beard / dressed in black pants – black vest – black commando hat – black boots – wolfpack belt / bandolero – whip – three boomerangs with brown chest belt – black chop stick – boomerang throwing device on right arm. Much in the same way that the earlier "Big Josh" figure used the same head sculpt as Big Jim, The Whip used the same head as Big Jeff, only with Black hair (Big Jeff was blond) and (not unlike Big Josh) a painted-on beard.
- Warpath / with wolfpack tattoo on left hand / Indian Figure / dressed in denim pants – leather vest – black top hat – brown boots – wolfpack belt / silver bow with wolfpack logo and three silver arrows with the wolfpack logo on top / brown chest belt for the arrows.
- Zorak the ruler of the Underworld / two faces which can be changed from normal into a Hulk-like villain / dressed in black pants and red cloak with gold chains – black boots.

== Pirate Series ==
In 1978, Mattel launched a pirate themed series exclusively in Europe. The series initially consisted of repaints and retooled figures, but eventually included some figures exclusive to the region.

- Captain Drake is an evil hooded pirate. He had a face-changing feature like Zorak and could change his face to a skull.
- Captain Hook
- Captain Flint/Sandokan

== Space Series ==
- Big Jim Space Leader
- Big Jim Laser Gunner
- Captain Laser was similar to the Captain Lazer made by Mattel in the Major Matt Mason line.
- Dr. Bushido is a villain who wields a glow-in-the-dark katana. The figure was exactly the same doll as Professor Obb.

== Spy Series ==
In 1979 and 1980, Mattel released a series of spy themed Big Jim figures.

- Big Jim 004
- Big Jim Secret Agent
- Big Jim Talking
- Commando Jeff
- Alpinist Joe
- Boris, the devious chauffeur is an evil chauffeur with a steel cap on his skull and a fist which could extend from his wrist with a cable.
- Professor Obb is a bearded mad scientist.
- Iron Jaw is a villain for the Italian spy series, with a metal lower jaw and a prosthetic arm ending in a hook which could be changed with other extensions that were stored in his green briefcase. This figure was never released, but appeared in catalogues and ads only.

== Global Command vs. Condor Force ==
The last Big Jim sci-fi themed series appeared in the 1980s and was only distributed in Europe. There were eight characters, four "good" and four "evil", divided into two opposing camps: "Global Command" and "Condor Force", respectively. The leaders of both groups were redesigned: new heads were sculpted for the Big Jim and Professor Obb figures.

Global Command

- Big Jim Commander
- Astros
- Dr. Alek
- Colonel Kirk

Condor Force

- Professor Obb
- Vektor
- Kobra
- Baron Fangg

== Big Jim's Vehicles & Bikes ==
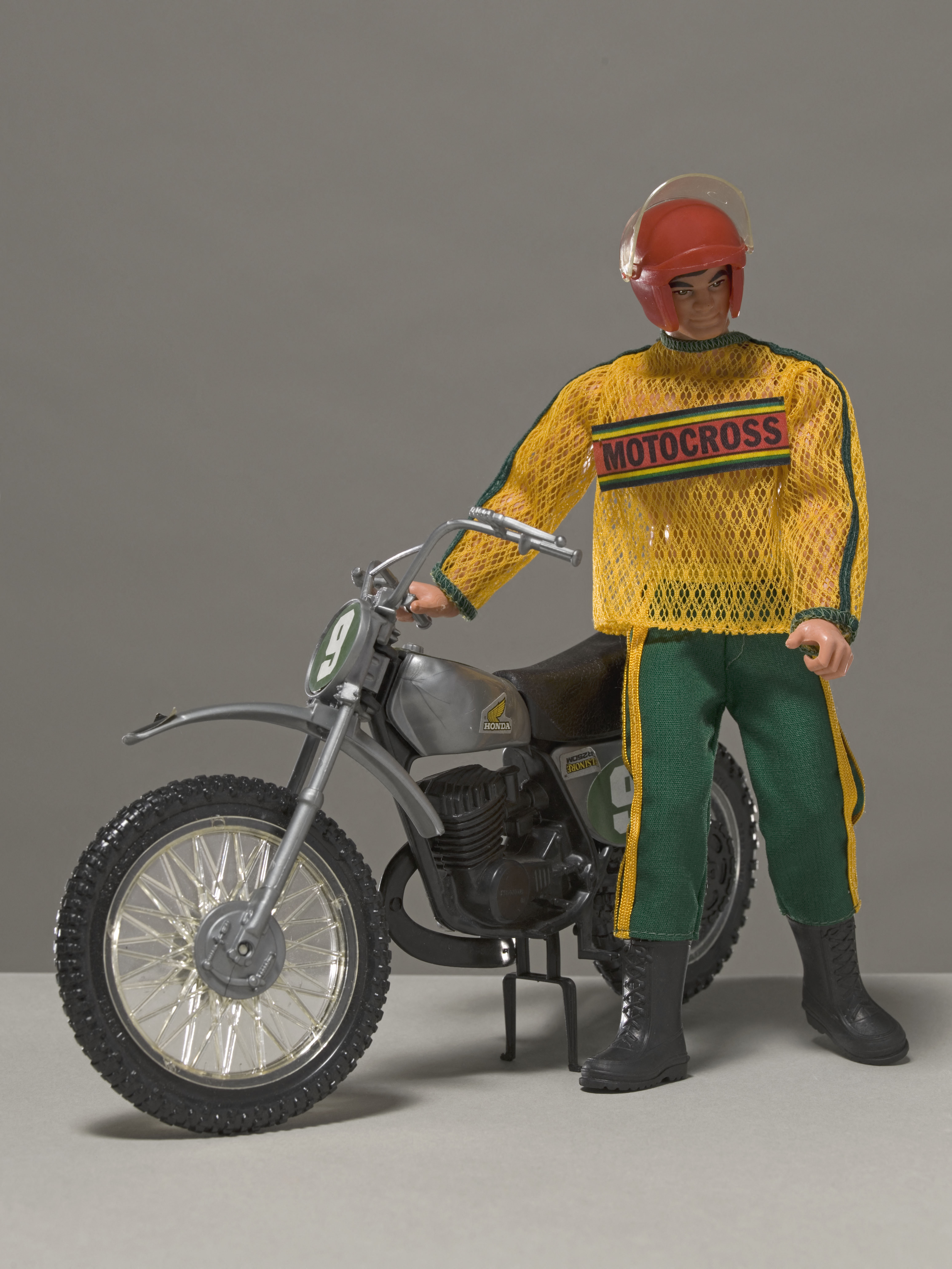
Big Jim with the Honda dirt bike

- BIG JIM RESCUE CHOPPER is a big yellow chopper designed for rescue in high and low places. This chopper was equipped with stretcher which can be used to transport a figure during a rescue mission and also was equipped with a real working search light below the chopper. The chopper can hold one figure in the chopper and another one in the rescue stretcher outside the chopper. Mattel released some other variations of this chopper in Big Jim lines
- RESCUE RIG was a large mobile unit similar to a fire truck, but with an interior, featuring an extending crane on the top, and it included various rescue gear, like a fire axe and a hook pole.
- SAFARI TRUCK was a green safari truck that could sit two figures in the front. It came with a rhinoceros and a net that could either be used to make a cage in the truck bed or as a capture net to snag the rhino. The truck also came with two removable red gasoline jerrycans housed in the rear sides as well as a winch in the front and a boom for the winch. Other accessories included a shovel, pic-axe, a single-barreled pump-action shotgun, and a long handled hatchet.
- DEVIL RIVER TRIP was an adventure set featuring a yellow one-man swamp fan-boat, and a mechanical alligator with a gear and pulley articulation which allowed it to "wiggle" along the floor or attach into a special geared niche in the boat (the boat had wheels to make it "glide" along the floor and it did not actually float).
- The HOWLER /HONDA DIRT BIKE was grey and the wheels were made of a rubber compound. The "Howler" version of the motorcycle had a wolf's head cowling on the front of the bike which could be removed for off-road riding. A helmet was included.
- SPORTS CAMPER is a large brown plastic wheeled camper, which came with camping gear and sporting accessories. This vehicle used the same moldings as the Barbie's Country Camper, but with different color plastic and printed vinyl patterns.
- THE BAJA BEAST CAMPER is the same model as the Safari truck except for the removable top on this truck, so it can be changed from a truck into a camper just by removing the top. This version could hold the Honda dirt bike in front of the truck. The truck colours were white with the Big Jim Allstar logo attached on the sides, interior was orange and it also featured some truck accessories like jerrycans etc.
- THE LAZERVETTE is a Corvette for Big Jim's P.A.C.K. that had laser cannons that flipped out of the hood.
- THE SKY COMMANDER is a jet airplane that folded into its own carry case. It had a single seat cockpit area and two main compartments. The forward compartment was the main operations center with equipment and radios. The rearward compartment included a fold-up bunk for Jim.
- BOAT AND BUGGY SET is a blue two seat dune buggy that came with a 15" boat (the same boat that came with the sports camper, only in blue), and a white boat trailer. The trailer also had two wheel slots to carry the motorcycle.

== Kid Acero ==
Most Big Jim toys from the early 1970s from the adventure and sport series were sold as "Kid Acero" (Kid Steel) in Latin America. All toys are exactly the same as in the American versions and were produced by a local Mattel subsidiary with only the name being changed. The Kid Acero toyline also included several figures which were exclusively created for the Mexican market, such as The Invisible Man, The Bionic Man, Garfio, and Nocton' and retooled and repainted versions of several Big Jim toys not available in the United States or Europe.

== Karl May's Winnetou and Old Shatterhand ==
A series based on the Wild West characters of the popular German writer Karl May (1842–1912) and especially the 1960s series of Karl May film adaptations was available in the late 1970s, including Old Shatterhand and Winnetou, Chief of the Apache. In addition to May's creations Old Firehand and Old Surehand, the character of Bloody Fox was invented for the toyline. With Nscho-Tschi, Winnetou's sister, a unique female character was introduced to the series. Mattel released six dolls in the Karl May line and they came in large green display boxes with the Karl May logo on the box.

The lineup was as follows:

- Winnetou: Indian figure with real hair / Snake bandana – Suede-like pants with purple addings on the side – silver rifle
- Old Shatterhand: Winnetou's sidekick / Fully dressed in suede-like trapper outfit with westernboots – gunbelt with two guns – peace pipe – rifle – hat
- Old Firehand: Bearded Trapper figure / bearskin-like hat – peace pipe – gunbelt with two guns – rifle
- Bloody Fox: Villain-like Indian figure with scar on face – rifle – chestbelt – gunbelt with two guns
- Old Surehand: Buffalo Bill-type figure also with real hair / hat – leather cowboy outfit – western boots – white tie – rifle – gunbelt with two guns
- Nscho-Tschi: Indian Squaw Doll / The only Barbie-type doll in the Big Jim / Karl May series / Squaw outfit with two carrying buckets

In other countries this series was renamed and distributed as part of the official Big Jim line. In Italy it appeared as Gli amici del West di Big Jim ("Big Jim's Friends of the West"), and in Spain it was made by Congost as Oeste ("West"). Most of the characters were also renamed for these releases.

- Winnetou was renamed Geronimo in both countries
- Old Shatterhand was renamed Dakota Joe
- Old Surehand became Buffalo Bill in Italy only
- Old Firehand became Old Kentuck in Italy and Kid Buffalo in Spain
- Bloody Fox became Bisonte Nero in Italy and Bisonte Negro in Spain
- Nscho-Tschi became Fresca Rugiada in Italy and India Apache in Spain

Furthermore, the Warpath character, known as Chief Tankua, was added to the West series in Italy.

== James Bond, Agent 007 ==
Most of the Big Jim toys from the early 1980s were sold as "James Bond" toys in Latin America. The American Spy and Space series were renamed "James Bond, secret agent 007". All toys are exactly the same as in the American and European versions and were produced by a local Mattel subsidiary. Only the brand on the packages is different.

== Other media ==
- Big Jim was parodied in the third season Robot Chicken episode "Endless Breadsticks" with Big Jim voiced by Patrick Warburton and Zorak voiced by Donald Faison.
- In Dog Man, a resident in Cat Jail is named after Big Jim.

=== Film ===
A live-action film adaptation produced by Mattel Films and directed by Dan Mazer was announced in 2022.

== Comics ==
Big Jim (Kid Acero) had his own title in Latin America which ran for 36 issues in 1979 published in Mexico by Editorial Novaro.
