= BRP Bienvenido Salting =

History

South Korea
- Name: PKM-229
- Builder: Korea Tacoma Shipyard, Chinhae, South Korea
- Launched: 1970s
- Commissioned: 1979
- Fate: Transferred to Philippine Navy in 1995

History

Philippines
- Name: BRP Bienvenido Salting (PG-112)
- Operator: Philippine Navy
- Acquired: 15 June 1995
- Commissioned: 22 May 1996
- Decommissioned: 31 October 2018
- Status: Decommissioned

General characteristics
- Class & type: Tomas Batillo class (Chamsuri Wildcat PKM class)
- Type: Fast Attack Craft
- Displacement: 148 tons full load
- Length: 121.4 ft (37 m)
- Beam: 22.6 ft (7 m)
- Draft: 5.6 ft (1.7 m)
- Propulsion: 2 × MTU MD 16V 538 TB90 diesel engines @ 6,000 horsepower.
- Speed: 33 knots (61 km/h) max
- Range: 600 nautical miles (1,100 km) at 20 knots
- Complement: 31
- Sensors & processing systems: Navigation and Surface Search Radar
- Armament: 1 × twin 30-mm 75-caliber Emerlec EX-30 guns; 1 × Bofors 40 mm Mk.3 naval gun; 2 × Oerlikon 20mm guns; 4 × 50-caliber Machine Guns

BRP Bienvenido Salting (PG-112) was a Tomas Batillo class fast attack craft of the Philippine Navy. Under the RPROK Defense Agreement, it was part of the first five PKM ships transferred by the South Korean government on 15 June 1995. It arrived in the Philippines in August 1995 and was commissioned with the Philippine Navy on 22 May 1996.

== Service history ==
The ship was first commissioned and deployed by the Republic of Korea as Patrol Killer Medium 225 (PKM-225) in 1979. Since its Philippine Navy commissioning, it was actively deployed to conduct coastal patrol interdiction. BRP Bienvenido Salting was one of the assets of the Naval Task Force “Stingray” in the conduct of Internal Security Operations and was deployed in Naval Forces Central Area of Responsibility to secure local communities and critical infrastructure in coastal areas and tourist spots.

As of 2012, the ship's fit-out is different from her sisterships which undertook refurbishing and updating works and still sports the original weapons fit-out.

Around mid-2016, the Philippine Navy started calling the ship in its new code designation "PC-112", following a new classification standard implemented in April 2016.

She was formally retired from service in a Decommissioning Ceremony at the Commodore Posadas Wharf East, Fort San Felipe, Cavite City on October 31, 2018, after serving 22 years in service.

== Technical Details ==
The ship is powered by 2 MTU MD 16V 538 TB90 diesel engines with total output of 6,000 horsepower.

The Bienvenido Salting is the only ship of the Tomas Batillo class still using the twin Emerlec 30mm guns and does not have the provisions for RHIB.
