= Monte Acero =

Mountain in Italy

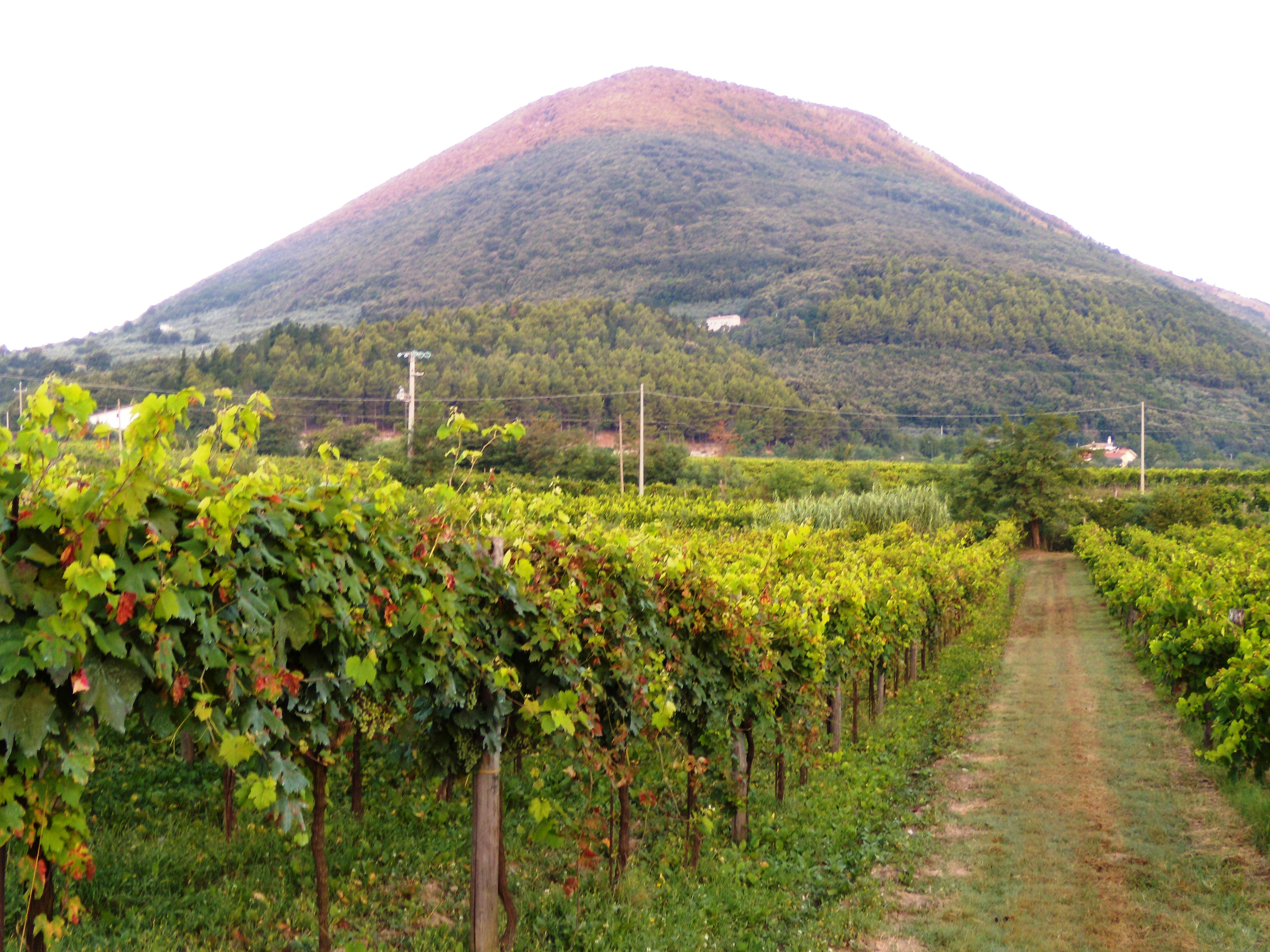
- Monte Acero seen from a road in Cerreto Sannita - San Salvatore Telesino early morning.

Highest point
- Elevation: 736 m (2,415 ft)
- Coordinates: 41°15′36″N 14°29′49″E

Geography
- Location within Italy
- Location: Benevento, Campania, Italy

Monte Acero is a mountain of Campania, Italy situated in the Telesina Valley and shared by the municipalities of San Salvatore Telesino and Faicchio, next to the Monaco di Gioia and its peaks, which are offshoots of the Matese mountains.

== Megalithic walls ==
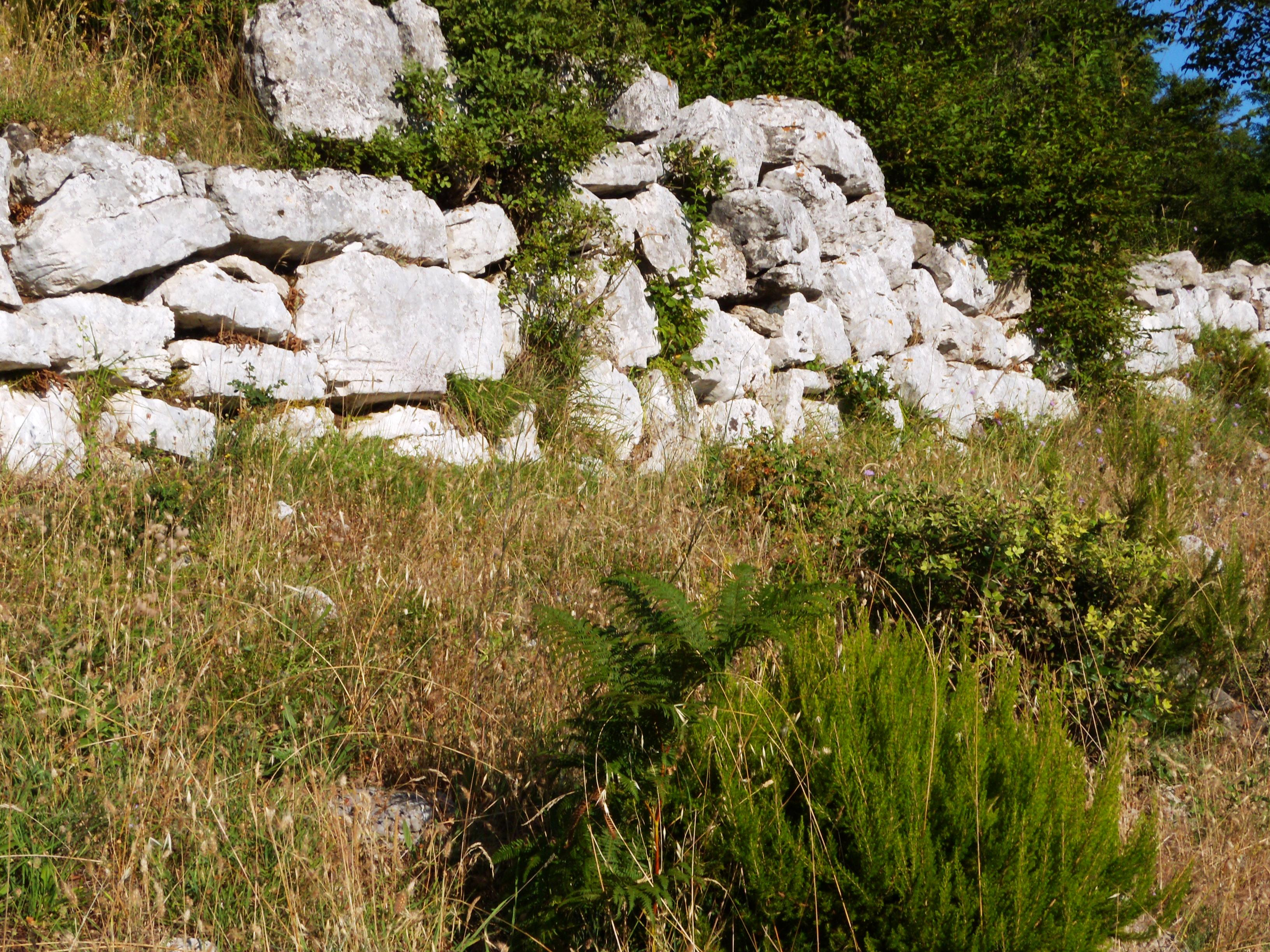
The megalithic walls.

The summit of the mountain is surrounded by roughly three kilometres of megalithic walls from the era of the Oscan Samnites (6th century B.C.) who constructed the so-called 'Monte Acero stronghold', a fortress that was used by the Samnites as an important lookout post.

The walls are constituted of large, dry-laid stone boulders. The most well-preserved part runs along the southern part of the mountain away from the paths.

There are two openings that have been identified as original: one to the south, facing Telesia, and another to the north.

The shape of the stone blocks tends to be rectangular and the space that is formed between the various blocks is filled with stones.

The average height is 3.5 metres.

== Monument to Christ the Redeemer ==
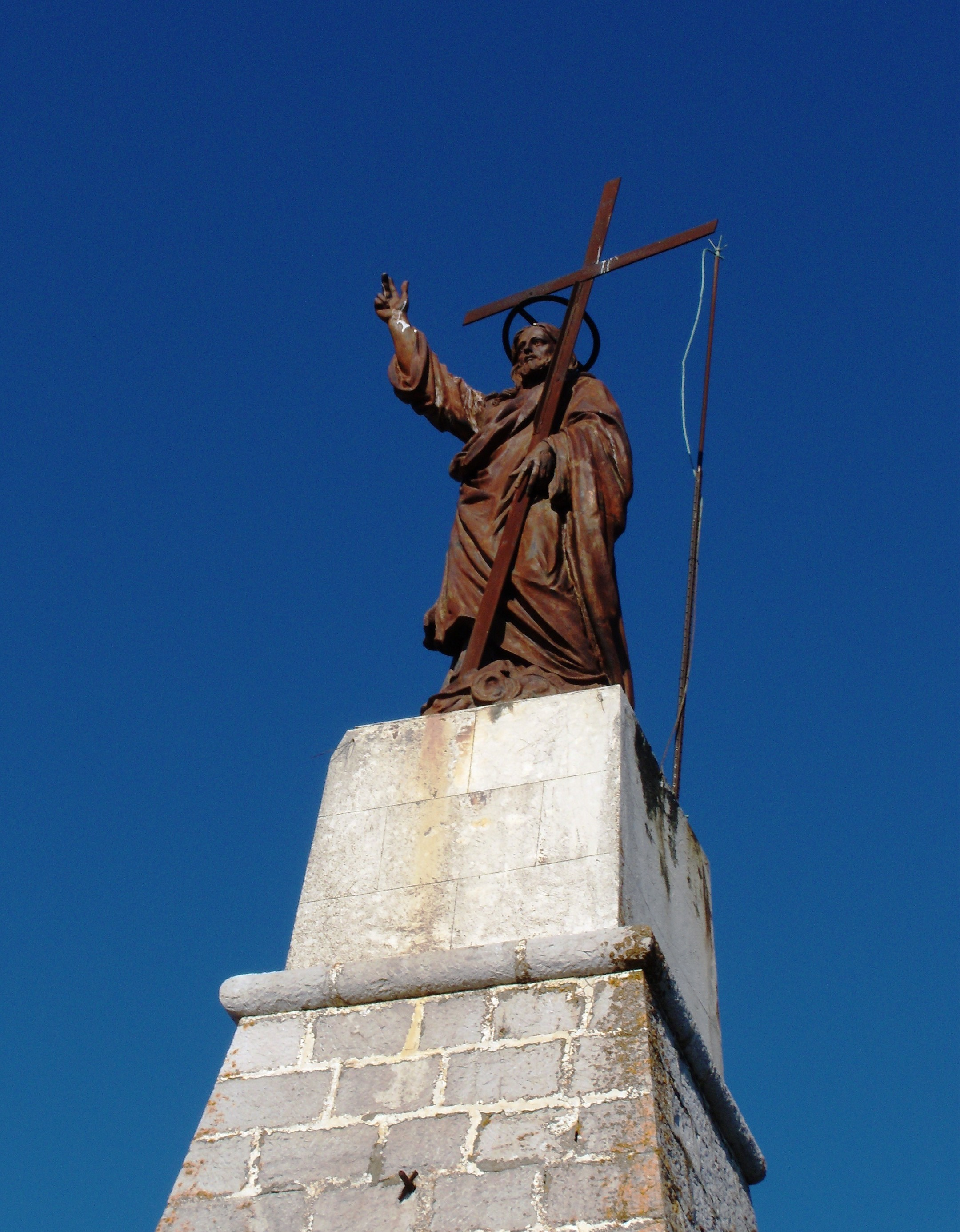
The monument to Christ the Redeemer.

On the eastern peak of the mountain stands the cast-iron statue of Christ the Redeemer, placed on top of a quadrangular pyramidal base made of ashlar with a narrow chapel inside.

The monument was erected in 1902 alongside a further nineteen statues of Christ commissioned by Pope Leo XIII to celebrate the new century and were designed by the Rosa Zanazio company in Rome.

At the time, it cost around 4,000 lire, which came from donations from across the diocese.

At the same time as the erection of the monument, the committee proposed the construction of a house at the foot of the mountain as a shelter for tuberculosis patients, but nothing was done due to lack of funds.

The current structure was restored in the 1970s at the expense of Emilio Bove after a storm caused the statue to collapse.

Early in the morning on the first Sunday of August each year, a pilgrimage takes place from Cerreto Sannita to remember the erection of the monument.
