= Tomas Batilo-class patrol craft =

Class of patrol boats of the Philippine Navy

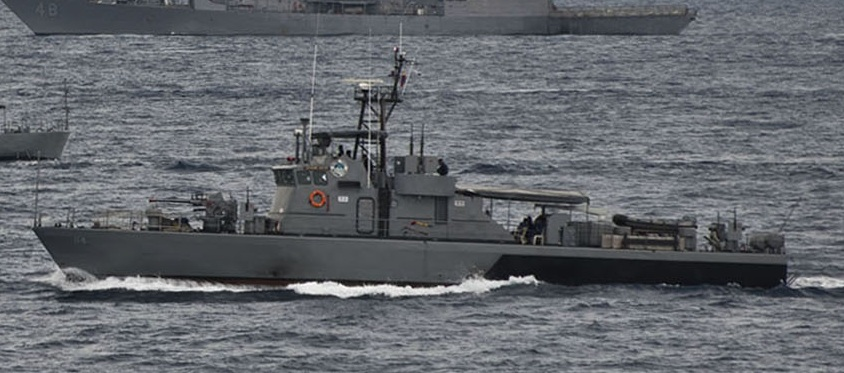
- BRP Salvador Abcede, a Tomas Batilo-class patrol craft

Class overview
- Name: Tomas Batilo class
- Builders: Korea Tacoma Shipyard, Chinhae, South Korea
- Operators: Philippine Navy
- Succeeded by: Acero-class patrol gunboat
- In service: 1996 - 2020
- Active: 0
- Lost: 2
- Retired: 6

General characteristics
- Type: Fast attack craft
- Displacement: 148 tons full load
- Length: 121.4 ft (37 m)
- Beam: 22.6 ft (7 m)
- Draft: 5.6 ft (1.7 m)
- Installed power: 5,800 hp (4,300 kW)
- Propulsion: 2 × Caterpillar 3516C diesel engines at 6,300 hp (4,700 kW), 2 shafts (for PG-111,114,116-118 or 2 MTU MD 16V 538 TB90 diesel engines at 6,000 hp (4,500 kW) (for PG-110, 112, 115).
- Speed: 33 knots (61 km/h) max
- Range: 600 nautical miles (1,100 km) at 20 kn (37 km/h; 23 mph)
- Boats & landing craft carried: 1 × Rigid Hull Inflatable Boat
- Complement: 31
- Sensors & processing systems: Koden Electronics MDC 1500 series navigation and surface search radar
- Armament: For upgraded ships: 1 × Bofors 40 mm Mk3 Mod 0 naval gun forward; 2 × Oerlikon 20 mm guns midships; 4 × .50-caliber machine guns; For non-upgraded ships: 1 × twin 30-mm 75-caliber Emerlec EX-30 guns / 1 × 20 mm Vulcan Gatling gun; 1 × Bofors 40 mm Mk 3 Mod 0 naval gun; 2 × Oerlikon 20 mm guns midships; 4 × .50-caliber machine guns
- Armour: Upgraded boats have armored windshields

The Tomas Batilo class was a ship class of eight patrol boats that previously served in the Philippine Navy. These ships were formerly used by the South Korean Navy as Chamsuri/Wildcat (PKM-200 series) class fast attack crafts. All eight ships have been retired from active service, with two units lost in separate incidents while the rest are in different states of disposal.

== History ==
Formerly Chamsuri - Wildcat class fast attack craft of the South Korean Navy built in the 1970s, with Korean designation as Patrol Killer Medium (PKM). South Korea transferred the former ROKN ships to the Philippine government, with the first batch of five units namely the former PKM-225, 226, 229, 231, and 235 which were handed-over on 15 June 1995, and arrived in Manila in August 1995. This batch became the following ships: BRP Tomas Batillo (PG-110) ex-PKM 225; BRP Boni Serrano (PG-111) ex-PKM 226; BRP Bienvenido Salting (PG-112) ex-PKM 229; BRP Salvador Abcede (PG-114) ex-PKM 231; and BRP Ramon Aguirre (PG-115) ex-PKM 235. Except for PG-115 which was used as spares after being written-off during a delivery accident, all where commissioned to the Philippine Navy on 22 May 1996.

Another PKM was delivered to the Philippine Navy in 1998 and was originally for spares, but this was activated by the Philippine Navy on 2 July 1998 which became BRP Nicolas Mahusay (PG-116).

The South Korean government granted a request by the Philippines to transfer another two units in 2004, and PKM 223 and PKM 232 was handed-over to the Philippine government in 2005, and was transferred from Chinhae Naval Base in Busan, South Korea, to Manila, Philippines, arriving on 30 May 2006. ex-PKM 232 was commissioned as BRP Dionisio Ojeda (PG-117) in 2007, while PKM 223 was commissioned as BRP Emilio Liwanag (PG-118) on 15 April 2008.

== Ships in class ==
Pennant number	Ship name	Acquired	Commissioned	Service	Decommissioned	Status
PG-110	BRP Tomas Batilo	15 June 1995	22 May 1996	Philippine Navy Patrol Force	2003	Sunk by typhoon in 2003, raised in 2009, sold for scrap
PC-111	BRP Bonny Serrano	15 June 1995	22 May 1996	Philippine Navy Littoral Combat Force	17 December 2020	Decommissioned
PC-112	BRP Bienvenido Salting	15 June 1995	22 May 1996	Philippine Navy Littoral Combat Force	31 October 2018	Decommissioned
PC-114	BRP Salvador Abcede	15 June 1995	22 May 1996	Philippine Navy Littoral Combat Force	1 March 2021	Decommissioned
PG-115	BRP Ramon Aguirre	15 June 1995	N/A	N/A	N/A	Accidentally damaged beyond economic repair during deliveries in 1995. Became parts hulk for sister ships.
PC-117	BRP Dionisio Ojeda	30 May 2006	2007	Philippine Navy Littoral Combat Force	June 2016	Sunk on 21 November 2018 as a target by the Philippine Navy's MPAC weapon system as part of the Navy's weapon demonstration of SPIKE ER.
PC-118	BRP Emilio Liwanag	30 May 2006	15 April 2011	Philippine Navy Littoral Combat Force	1 March 2021	Decommissioned
PC-119	BRP Nicolas Mahusay	1998	2 July 1998	Philippine Navy Littoral Combat Force	29 January 2020	Decommissioned. Formerly PG-116 / PC-116 but was renumbered for superstitious reasons.

== Gallery ==
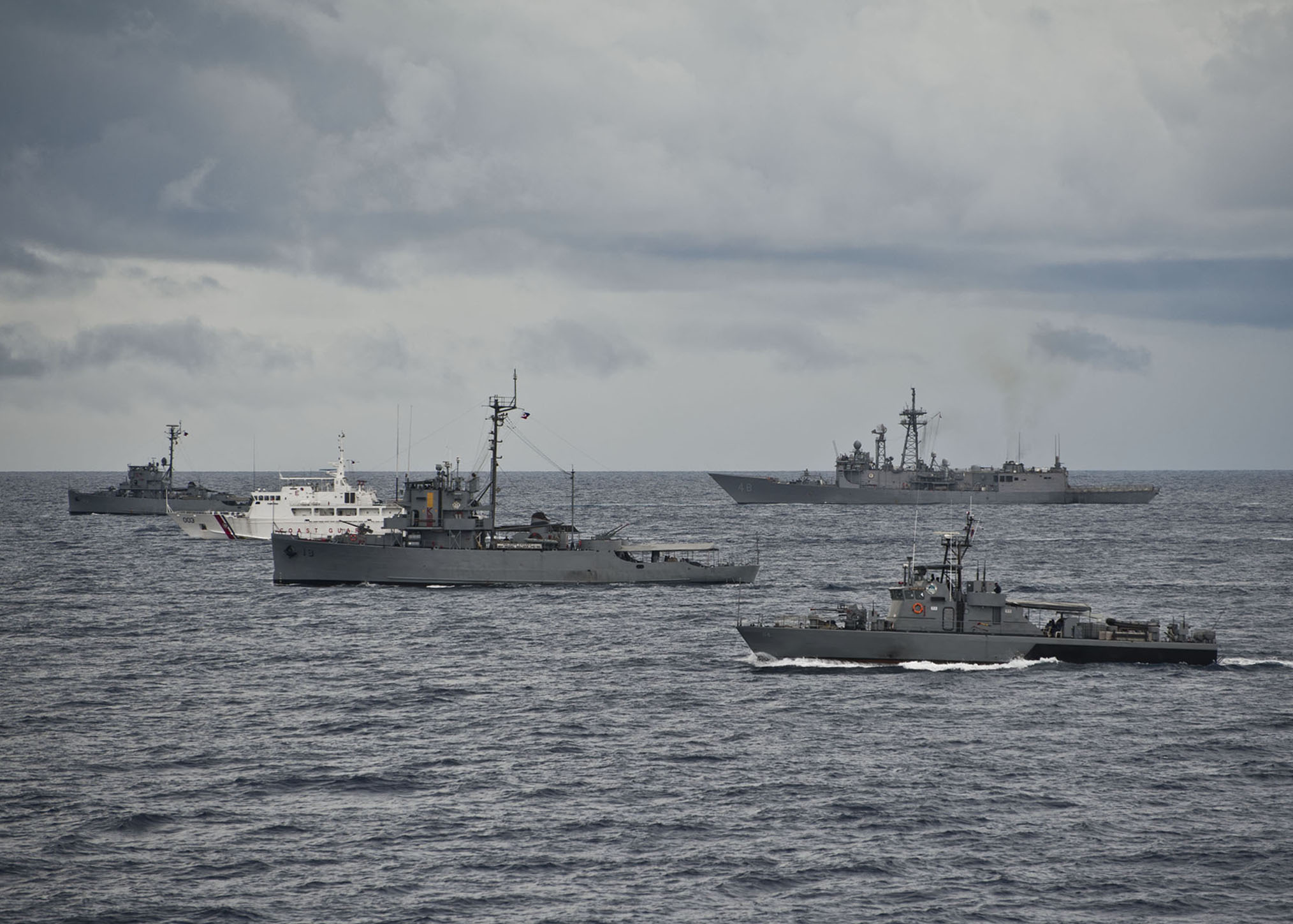
BRP Salvador Abcede with other US and Philippine ships at CARAT Philippines 2012

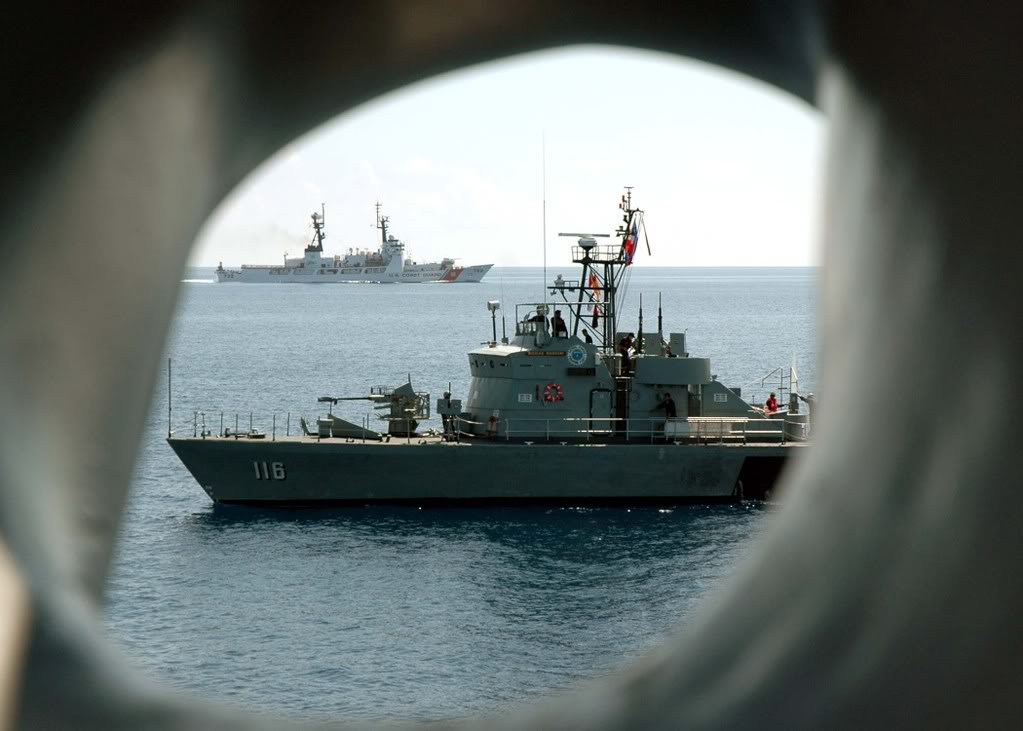
BRP Nicolas Mahusay at CARAT Philippines 2008

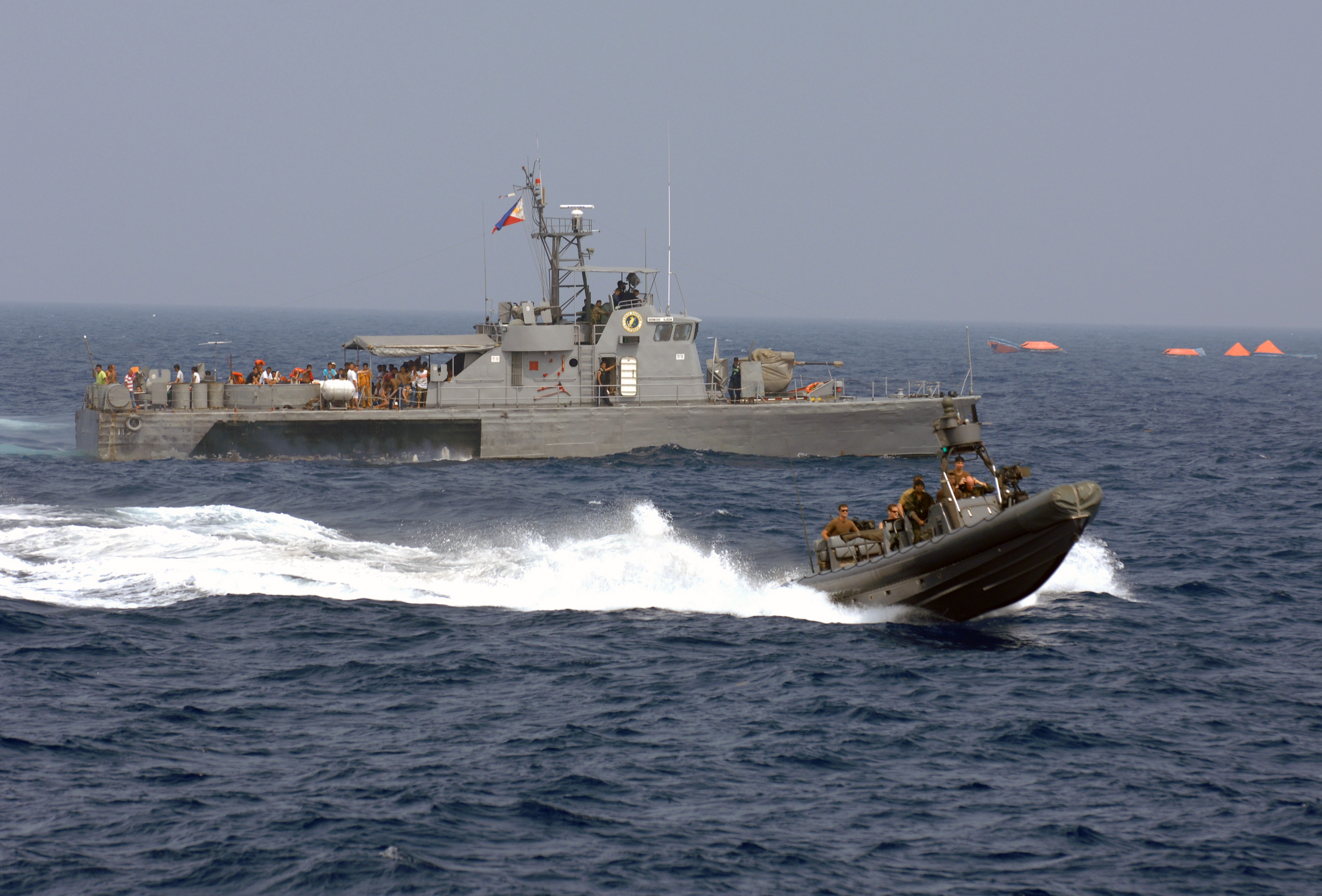
BRP Dionisio Ojeda during search and rescue operations

== See also ==
- List of decommissioned ships of the Philippine Navy
