= Amós Acero =

Spanish politician (1893–1941)

Amós Acero Pérez (31 March 1893 – 16 May 1941) was a Spanish Socialist Workers' Party politician under the Second Spanish Republic. He was born in Villaseca de la Sagra as the 3rd of 7 children. After the victory of the Nationalist faction in the Spanish Civil War, he was arrested by the new authorities. Following an investigation of his past by the Brigada Político-Social, he was brought to trial and was executed by the government of Francisco Franco in Madrid.

== See also ==
- List of people executed by Francoist Spain
