= Kid Acero =

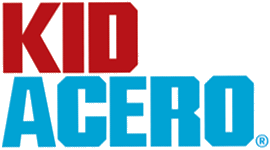

- Some of the figures marketed, fltr: Invisible Man, Kid Acero, and Bionic Man
- Product type: Action figure
- Current owner: Mattel
- Produced by: CIPSA
- Country: Mexico
- Introduced: 1974
- Discontinued: 1980; 46 years ago
- Related brands: Big Jim

Kid Acero (the surname translates from the Spanish as "Steel") was the brandname under which CIPSA –a Mexican subsidiary of Mattel– used to distribute and sell the popular Big Jim line of action figures for the Latin American market (with regional variations). While most of the toys were exactly the same as the US templates, a few of them were retooled, repainted and repurposed, and sold using different names and scenarios. These variations are notoriously hard to find, even at local markets and international auctions.

Most of the series focused on two entirely different characters: Kid Acero and James Bond. For over five years a comic book series dedicated to the Kid Acero toy line was also produced; the character proved a very successful franchise.

== Background ==
Kid Acero is a 19-year-old fictional sports star, who travels around the world to participate in international sports competitions. He also is a special covert operations agent (and later a superhero), who works for an intelligence agency under the aegis of the UN during the Cold War. Kid Acero is recruited to fight an enemy organization named COBRA whose leader is Doctor Drago, is a mad scientist who attempts to conquer the world. Acero has the assistance of two public superheroes code named Invisible and Bionic, and together they form a team known as the LOBO Squadron, "lobo" being the Spanish masculine noun for wolf.

The main headquarters of LOBO are deep inside a cavern in the Sonoran Desert. The team has several different vehicles as transportation and back up. They often uses a minijet, a turbojet backpack with retractable wings and a large behemoth vehicle used as a mobile headquarters. Kid Acero also has a trained eagle who helps him in his adventures in the wilderness. The COBRA Organization has his main headquarters in a volcanic island located baguely in the Gulf of Mexico, and also safe houses around the world.

A similar plot was later used by Mattel in 1999 when they launched the action figure Max Steel.

== Main characters ==
=== Heroes ===
- Kid Acero – The "basic" good guy leader of the LOBO Squadron. It is widely accepted that Kid Acero is a nickname and not his real name (à la Kid Azteca); his real name is never revealed. He has a friendly and healthy personality, and is an expert at all kinds of sports, competing on an international level. He has a large number of gold medals and trophies due to his dedication to a healthy lifestyle and fitness regimen..
- Invisible Man – Good friend and partner of Kid Acero. His real name is unknown; most of the characters simply call him "Invisible". He has a clownish personality, but is also extremely greedy, yet somehow is also extremely attractive to women. He is repeatedly seen flirting, despite the fact he seems to have a serious relationship with his girlfriend, Malù (one of a few black characters at the time who was not heavily stereotyped). Invisible by large had the largest supporting cast of the trio, with a large family and several recurring friends. Among the most frequent of these supporting characters were his nephew, the "Genius Child Amadeus" (kind of a 12 years old mad scientist), Amadeus` grandfather (who is presumably Invisible's uncle), and "Abue" (Granny) Gertudis (Invisible's grandmother, and his combat trainer! Negro ("black} Ezequiel has a stereotypical Cuban accent, and Gordo (fat) Zapìaìn (who is possibly based on the series editor), and finally and Quicxic, a talking spider monkey whom they had found in the Chiapas jungle and adopted.
- Bionic Man – CIPSA's response to the Six Million Dollar Man, had had two bionic legs and a bionic right arm, but not the eye. As with other members of the LOBO Squadron, he is just called "Biónico" instead of his real name (assuming he has one). He is an ex-astronaut who was reconstructed using bionic implants after crash landing after successful mission on space. Owing to military training, he has the most serious personality among the members of LOBO –and is often a bit obnoxious.

=== Villains ===
- Doctor Drago – The supreme leader of COBRA. (The character is none other than Big Jim's Dr. Steel, albeit revamped with a different name). In the comic he plays a role quite similar to that of Lex Luthor: a mad scientist who has large technological resources at his disposal. That he seemed to have a relatively friendly relationship with Invisible, even loaning him over 500,000 USD at one time.
- Garfio el Temible – "Hook the Fearsome", a mercenary, weapons specialist and bodyguard. He is new character created using parts of different Big Jim toys, with a hook for a left hand. In the comics he was quite the dumb sidekick to Doctor Drago.
- Nocton – An extraterrestrial. He has light green slightly phosphorescensent. Hailing from a distant galaxy, and he is using Doctor Drago as a tool to understand mankind in order to facilitate his own conquest. Interestingly the exactly same action figure was released exclusively for the German for the Space: 1999 franchise.
- Zorak – Exactly the same villain as in the original Big Jim toy line (not to be confused with the mantid Zorak of the Space Ghost franchise.) He is a rival of Doctor Drago, and fights Kid Acero for his twisted purposes, but sometimes teams up with Drago in an alliance of convenience. Regionally he was known as "Zorak, the Dual Menace" instead of Double Trouble Zorak, being able to change his head and face into a monstrous green visage.
- Rubicunda Von Kraupp – Created exclusively for the comic, she was despite her ludicrously Teutonic name the capo di tutti capi of all the American Mafias. Weighing 200 kg, and had the weirdest motive of all the villains in the comic –to marry Invisible Man! Even more weirderly, Drago falls in love with her at one point, and went to great lengths to win her heart. And seemingly, he did!

== Success ==
- Kid Acero was sold from 1974 to 1980. After this date the name of the toy line changed to James Bond until it was retired from the market in 1986.
- Comics based on the Kid Acero toyline ran for several years, first Kid Acero alone as a feature in an anthology comic book named "Estrellas del Deporte" (Sports Stars), which originally featured biographies of famous sport idols; then the Lobo Squadron was included, beginning to feature more standard superhero style stories, that ran for several issues; and lastly, each one of the trio received his own comic. Kid Acero's had a heavy bent to sci-fi action adventure, Invisible Man's was more comedic, and Bionic Man's tended to be mystery and horror inclined. Bionic Man's title was the shortest lived, Kid Acero lasted longer, but and the last to be cancelled was Invisible Man.
- Kid Acero was the best selling toy for over 4 consecutive years in the Latin American Market.

== Provenance and details of the Kid Acero line ==
Due to the popularity of several local boxing figures on Latin America's sports circuit, and the increasing rejection of products considered representative of United States interventions in the region, Mattel left the marketing decisions to a Mexican licensing company named CIPSA which produced a broad variety of plastic products, including a large line of plastic containers similar to Tupperware's. This company also had the local licenses for other Mattel lines including Hot Wheels and Barbie, and licenses from Disney. In 1974 CIPSA introduced Big Jim to the Mexican market as Kid Acero (which translates as "Kid Steel"), with the tagline Kid Acero es el campeón (Kid Acero is the champion). It was under this name that CIPSA distributed and sold most of the Big Jim toy line.

Most of the accessories available were exactly the same as in the American market, except that some clothing for the figures included the colors used by popular soccer national teams. Only the text on the toy boxes and of their instruction sheet were changed to Spanish language. There is no way to tell which action figure was sold in the North American market and which the South American, inasmuch as both were produced in the same factories using the same molds, colors, materials; even the artwork for the packages was the same. Mattel's serial numbers and copyrights remained on the figures; nominal Big Jim vintage action figures in California or Texas may be Kid Acero figures.

The first Kid Acero was the Big Jim standard figure from 1974 which came with red shorts and included a baseball, a dumbbell, a muscle test band, and a breakable karate board. Other outfits, accessories, and vehicles were sold separately. Later the same figure was repackaged in boxes which included one of the sport, adventure, and jungle outfits, along with their accessories, directly taken from the US '72 and '73 Big Jim line.

The second figure of the line was Karzak, which was the same as the American Big Josh figure except that it came with a bamboo tree (from the Big Jeff figure) instead of a log. Also the eagle and the gauntlet from Big Jim's The Eagle of Danger Peak package was included along Karzak. Karzak and his eagle were featured in one issue of the Estrellas del Deporte comic, helping Kid Acero to return from the jungle after his plane crashes.

The second series introduced a Heroes and Villains theme, with the third figure introduced as the villain Doctor Drago, Kid Acero's archenemy (the same as the Dr. Steel figure in US, except that in the US it was left to the children to decide if it was friend or foe). No major changes were done in the toys for a couple of years, but after the introduction of the Wolf P.A.C.K. in the US CIPSA introduced the same concept with the Escuadrón Lobo (Wolf Squad), with the same vehicles but a notoriously different cast of characters.

Escuadrón lobo comprised Kid Acero, which also had a Kid Acero Brazo Bala version with a bullet arm, Karzak, and uniquely to the Latin America market, Invisible Man and El Hombre Biónico (Bionic Man). Their enemy was Organización Cobra (Cobra Organization) which comprised Doctor Steel, Double Trouble Zorak (who, unlike his American counterpart, had an entire glow-in-the-dark skull as its second face), and Garfio and Nocton were two completely new characters created exclusively for the Mexican market.

Later the Kid Acero line was replaced by the James Bond Line. Two more villains were added later, neither related to Kid Acero's storyline.

== LOBO vs. COBRA ==
In 1979, CIPSA created a Kid Acero subline named LOBO Squadron, which was originally inspired by Big Jim's P.A.C.K. The same wolf logo used on P.A.C.K. toys was adopted as the team's image. The LOBO Squadron was composed of three heroes, who joined forces to fight against an increasing army of evil characters who are known solely as COBRA, whose leader is no other than Kid Acero's long time-adversary Doctor Drago. ("Cobra" is identical in English and Spanish.)

The LOBO Squadron line was mostly composed of retooled toys and repaints. CIPSA took the decision to substitute the right arm of Kid Acero for the one used in the American Torpedo Fist—a Big Jim's action figure—and renamed the toy as Kid Acero Brazo-Bala (Bullet-Arm). For the next 4 years, Bullet-Arm was the most wanted action figure in the Latin American market. Several other versions of Kid Acero were released along the years in the normal line, but none sold as much as the Bullet-Arm version. The real Torpedo Fist never was produced in Latin America.

For some reason, instead of introducing other known Big Jim's villains or friends, CIPSA decided to create their own, but using parts of Big Jim toys. The LOBO Squad initial series introduced Garfio (The Hook), a weapons specialist armed with boomerangs and a bullwhip as associate of Doctor Drago, who has joined forces with Zorak, the Dual Menace. As a result of this new threat, Kid Acero recruits two popular superheroes named Invisible Man and Bionic Man. The LOBO Squadron plot presents all characters as skilled martial arts combatants, and for this reason, most of the figures of this sub line have minimal clothes, mostly black kung fu pants or sport pants. Some characters do not wear shoes at all.

Garfio is in fact a tanned skin Torpedo Fist action figure with hook instead of left arm (but without the spring action as in the Big Jim's Pirate series). His hair was repainted black and was dressed with the same pants and boots as Kid Acero Bullet-Arm in black, but also came with The Whip's accessories and weapons. The original Whip action figure wasn't released in Mexico.

Invisible Man was a translucent basic Big Jim body with two removable heads. One head is the normal Big Jim or Big Jeff's head (of which two versions were available) with blonde hair, whereas the other was nominally transparent. (With wear and time the plastic becomes whitens or yellows). The interior rubber band that joins the hip with the body was also white. It came with a blue sport suit and gloves. When fully dressed the normal head gives the impression of a normal human male. When undressed his transparent head and body are revealed.

Due to the high demand of Kenner's The Six Million Dollar Man action figure, CIPSA released his own version of the same TV character. Its creation was solely a local decision made after the real Six Million Dollar Man action figure, aka "El Hombre Nuclear" in Spanish, and made by Lili Ledy toy company in Mexico, was retired from the Latin American market due to licensing problems in an effort to capitalize the character's current popularity. On its initial run, Bionic Man was a stand-alone action figure with no relation at all with any other CIPSA lines of toys. One year later, a sticker was added in the front of the box with the line "a Kid Acero's friend!". Next year the box was retouched to present him as official part of LOBO. Bionic Man is a Big Jeff basic figure, but dressed in a silver jumper. He has a bionic arm, but instead of the Kung-Fu Grip which was one of the main characteristics of the Six Million Dollar Man action figures, Bionic Man had magnets on his right hand and in several accessories which represents heavy containers and pipe tubes. Using the magnets, Bionic Man carries or pushes away extremely heavy bulks. This action figure does not have a bionic eye with zoom-in features, but in the comic he has it. His most notorious characteristic is it has a translucent right arm, so you can see his internal metallic bones surrounded by cables and circuits.

Several Big Jim figures who shared the same changing face feature were sold as different versions of Zorak, the Dual Menace, including the original Double Trouble and Captain Drake.

In 1980, a last villain was introduced in the series. This time was an alien named Nocton, Master of Darkness (sometimes he is called Noc-Tar in the comic). This one originally was an unproduced Mattel's Space: 1999 model named "Zython". By its second season, Space 1999 suffered a drastic drop in popularity and Zhyton was dropped before being released in the American Market. He was briefly released on Europe though. It is not clear why he was added to COBRA Organization instead of other CIPSA's space related toys. His face resembles an Egyptian pharaoh more than an alien creature. He has light green skin and huge ears. Some Nocton figures had light up features, other figures glows in the dark, and at least one of them had a flying saucer, which looks more like a huge lifesaver which attaches to his hips. Collectors must keep in mind that despite the fact both figures looks almost identical at first sight, Nocton is two inches smaller than Zython. His size was reduced to match the size of all other Big Jim's action figures.

All Vehicles used by LOBO Squadron are black, while all COBRA Organization's are Silver. Most of the Big Jim's originally black colored vehicles were added to the LOBO toys line. The 1979 Big Jim's Lazer-vette is probably the most notorious one. Its package was retouched to substitute Torpedo and Jim from the box' front for Kid Acero and Invisible Man, and the toy was renamed Lobo Laser. The Devil Dune Buggy was repainted silver and released as Cobra-mobile.

The Kid Acero Series was gradually retired from the Latin American market and eventually substituted by the James Bond Series.

== The James Bond series ==
At some point in the late 1970s, Mattel started to make presence on its own in the Latin American market instead of licensing its products, and for this reason, many licenses were canceled or reassigned. It is not clear what happened to CIPSA, but the company disappeared short after this decision was made. Most accepted version indicates it was acquired by Mattel. By 1980, Mattel took the decision to relaunch Big Jim as its own line of action figures for the region. This time, all Big Jim's Adventure, Space and Spy series were collected in a James Bond themed series. Same as with Kid Acero, Mattel simply changed the text on the toy's boxes to Spanish and sell the toys under the James Bond, Agent 007 name instead of Big Jim. All other characteristics remained the same.

Most toys included in the James Bond line were shipped exactly the same as they were on United States. Out of the box, there's no way to tell which ones are or not American since all toys were produced at the same factories.

Same as it happened with LOBO, Mattel focused the entire line in a specific Big Jim model. This time was the '79 Big Jim Secret Agent which came with four exchangeable faces who was renamed "James Bond". Some time later other Spy and Space Big Jim action figures were renamed Bond too. The main villains of this series were Professor O.B.B. and Boris. This last one was renamed Boris Craneo de Acero (Boris SteelSkull). The professor is supposed to be the leader of SPECTRE, while Boris is KGB's prime director.

The James Bond series lasted up to 1986, when it was officially retired from the market.

=== CIPSA Hot Wheels ===
A small handful of Hot Wheels have been found with unusual colors along with the Mattel "meatball" replaced with the CIPSA logo.

== Comics ==
Kid Acero had his own title in Latin America which ran for 36 issues in 1979–80, published in Mexico by Editorial Novaro.
