= Nestor Acero =

Filipino soldier and Medal of Valor recipient

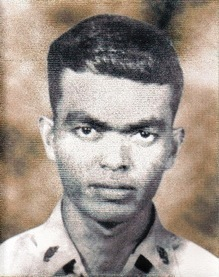
- Died: 27 November 1972; Jolo, Sulu, Philippines
- Military career
- Allegiance: Philippines
- Branch: Philippine Marine Corps
- Rank: Private First Class
- Service number: 574126
- Units: 7th Marine Company; Philippine Marine Corps
- Conflicts: Moro conflict
- Awards: Philippine Medal of Valor

Nestor F. Acero was an enlisted Marine of the Philippine Marine Corps and a recipient the Philippines' highest military award for courage, the Medal of Valor. Acero was assigned as rifleman in the 7th Marine Company in Jolo, Sulu on 26–27 November 1972 when his company along with the 8th Marine Company assaulted a hill defended by approximately 500 Moro rebels. The marines encountered heavy resistance and took casualties. A withdrawal was eventually ordered from Battalion level. Acero however, was nursing a wounded comrade and elected to cover the withdrawal of the rest of his unit. He was killed in action.

The BRP Nestor Acero (PG-901) - the lead ship of the Philippine Navy's Acero-class fast attack interdiction craft - was named after him.

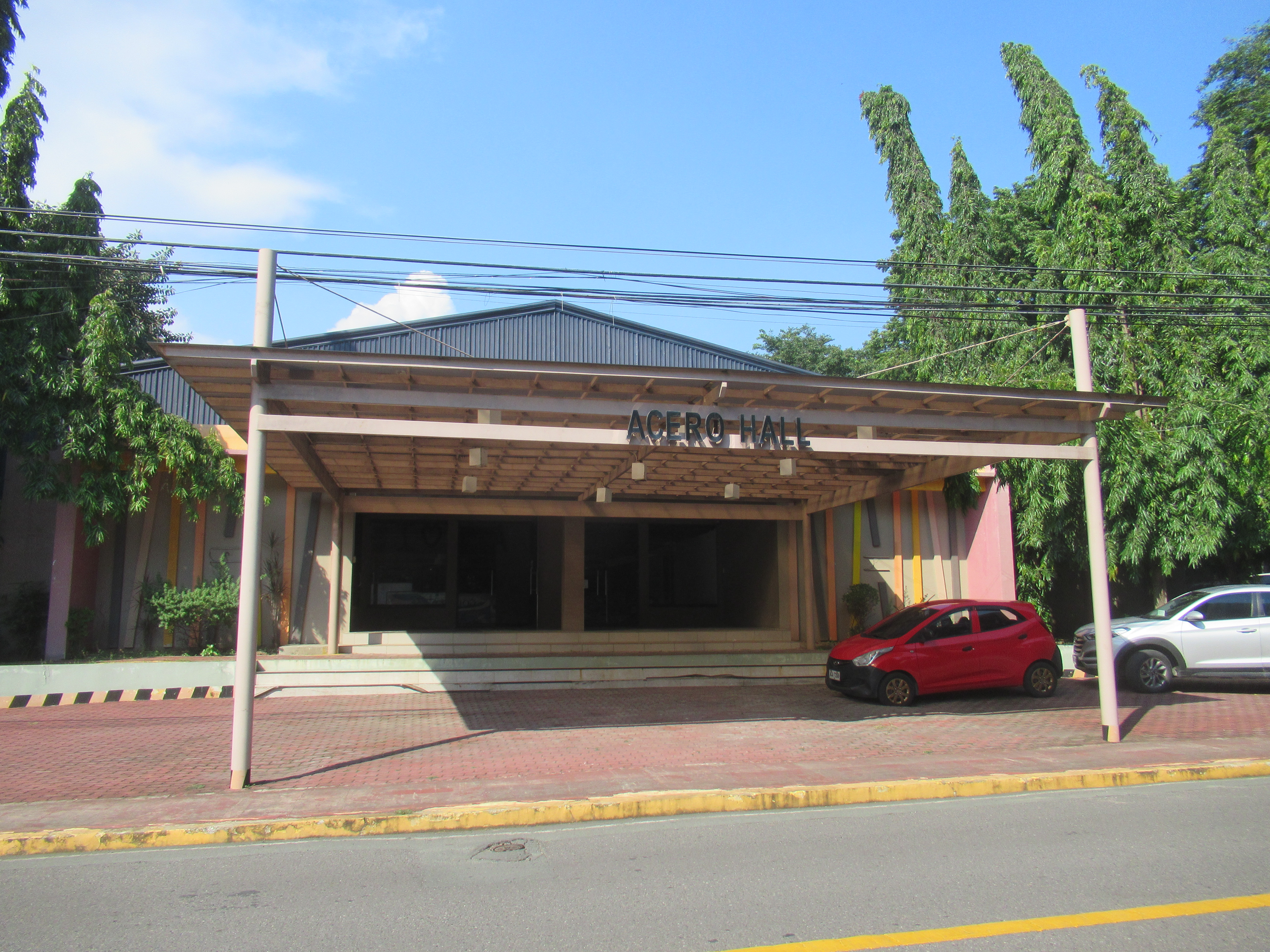
Acero Hall

== Medal of Valor citation ==
"By direction of the President, pursuant to paragraphs 3a and 10, Section I, Armed Forces of the Philippines regulations G 131-052, this Headquarters, dated 24 April 1967, the MEDAL FOR VALOR is hereby posthumously awarded to:

Private First Class Nestor F Acero 574126
Philippine Navy (Marines)

"For conspicuous gallantry and intrepidity at the risk of life above and beyond the call of duty against heavily armed and numerically superior Muslim outlaws in the vicinity of Sibalo Hill Punai, Jolo, Sulu from 26 to 27 November 1972.

As the 7th and 8th Marine Companies, serving as assault units, approached the top of the hill they were met with heavy resistance from the enemy’s 30-caliber and 50-caliber machine guns and surrounded by about 500 fully armed outlaws. Defending their grounds against intense enemy fire from automatic and crew-served weapons, the two companies suffered heavy casualties and found their positions untenable. Upon order of the Battalion Commander, the two companies started to disengage themselves from the scene of battle. Private First Class Acero of the 7th Marine Company, then designated rifleman, was at that time defending his ground and nursing his wounded teammate and friend, Private First Class Buaya. He sensed the futility of evacuating the latter without being hit by enemy fire. Despite orders of his superiors, he decided to stay behind to take care of other critically wounded comrades and cover the withdrawal of the rest of the troops. His gallant defense through ferocious fighting attracted heavy volume of enemy fire to concentrate on him, thus relieving the pressure on the withdrawing elements from incurring further casualty. When recovery teams were sent out after the savage battle, they found 30 or more dead outlaws in the periphery of the dead body of Private First Class Acero whose left arm was cradling the neck of Private First Class Buaya.

This display of gallantry and heroism at the sacrifice of his life above and beyond the call of duty distinguished Private First Class Acero as among the finest in the military service."
