= BRP Bagong Silang =

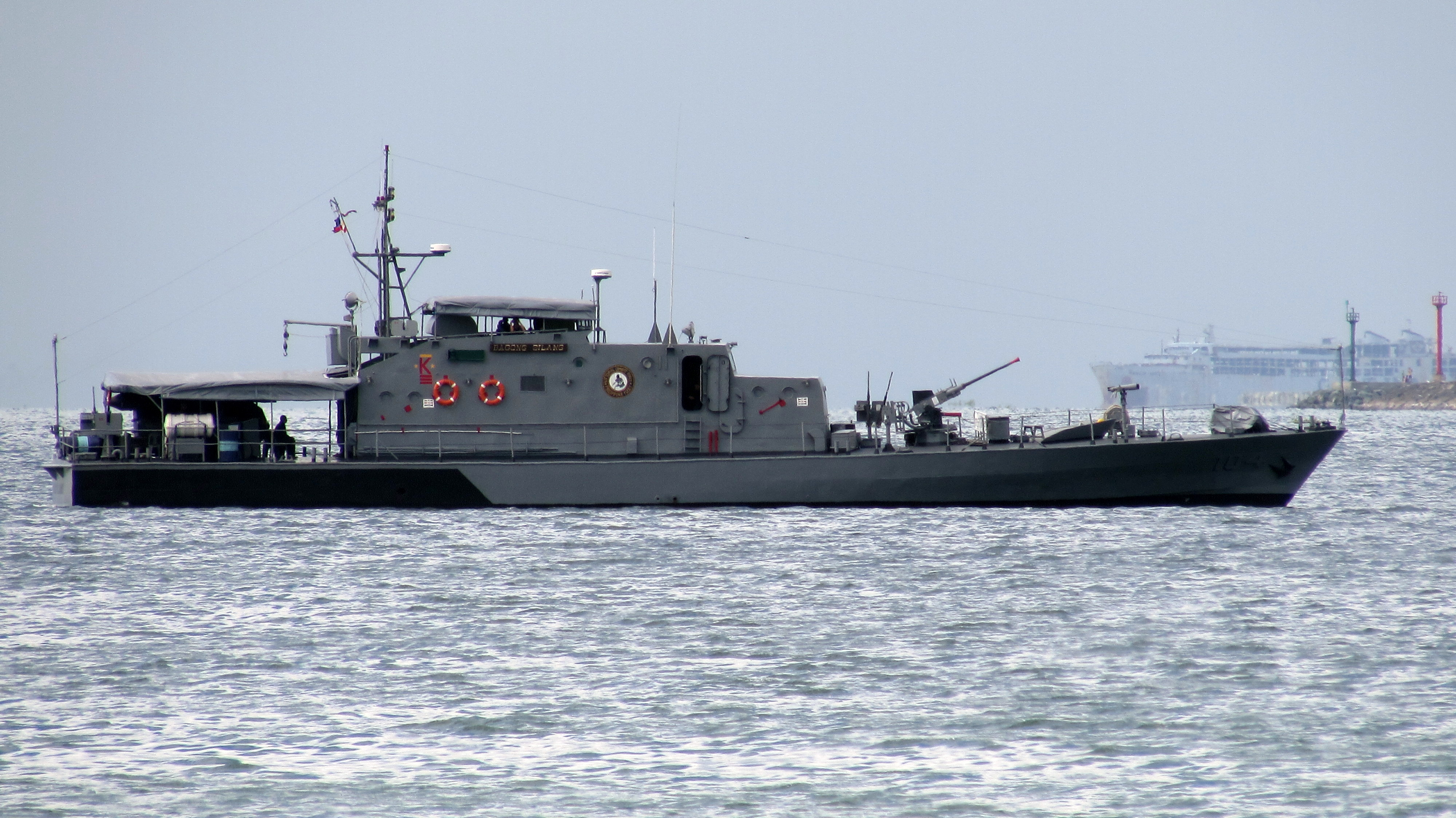
- BRP Bagong Silang (PG-104) on station in Manila Bay during the APEC Summit in 2015.

History

Philippines
- Name: Bagong Silang
- Namesake: "Bagong Silang" means "New Born" in English
- Operator: Philippine Navy
- Ordered: 1978
- Builder: Cavite Naval Shipyard, Cavite City, Philippines
- Commissioned: June 1983
- Recommissioned: 1994
- Decommissioned: 1992
- Reclassified: April 2016 to PB-104
- Status: in active service

General characteristics
- Class & type: Kagitingan class
- Type: Coastal Patrol Interdiction Craft
- Displacement: 160 tons full load
- Length: 121.4 ft (37.0 m)
- Beam: 20.3 ft (6.2 m)
- Draft: 5.6 ft (1.7 m)
- Propulsion: 2 x 2,050 hp MTU16V538TB91 MD 871/30 16-cylinder diesels, 2 shafts; 2 x GM-EMD 6-71 auxiliary diesels; 1 x 60 kW generator
- Speed: 21 knots (39 km/h) maximum
- Range: 2,300 nmi (4,300 km) maximum
- Complement: 30
- Sensors & processing systems: Furuno Navigation / Surface Search Radar
- Armament: 1 × Bofors Mark 3 40mm/60 caliber gun; 4 × M2HB Browning 12.7 mm/50-cal. GP machine guns; 2 × M60 7.62 mm/30-cal. GP machine guns

BRP Bagong Silang (PB-104) is the fourth ship of the Kagitingan class coastal patrol interdiction crafts of the Philippine Navy. It was designed in Germany, and built in the Philippines, and was commissioned with the Philippine Navy in June 1983 as BRP Bagong Silang (PG-104).

It was reclassified to BRP Bagong Silang (PB-104) in April 2016 under the new classification standards of the Philippine Navy classifying it as a patrol boat.

== Design ==
The boat and all the ships in its class was considered to be unsuccessful, and was originally designed to have a maximum speed of 28 knots, but the design failed to achieve the said speed as it was underpowered.

The boat was installed with the Selenia Orion RTN-10X fire control radar and Selenia Elsag NA-10 Mod.0 gunfire control system, but it appears that they have been removed.

It was also originally armed with the Emerlec EX-31 30mm twin gun mount, but was replaced by a Bofors Mark 3 40mm/60 caliber gun several years later.
