= BRP Bagong Lakas =

History

Philippines
- Name: Bagong Lakas
- Namesake: "Bagong Lakas" means "New Strength" in English
- Operator: Philippine Navy
- Ordered: 1978
- Builder: W. Muller Shipyard, Hamelin, Germany
- Commissioned: 9 February 1979
- Recommissioned: 1994
- Decommissioned: 1992
- Reclassified: 1980 to PG-102, April 2016 to PB-102
- Status: Decommissioned

General characteristics
- Class & type: Kagitingan class
- Type: Coastal Patrol Interdiction Craft
- Displacement: 160 tons full load
- Length: 121.4 ft (37.0 m)
- Beam: 20.3 ft (6.2 m)
- Draft: 5.6 ft (1.7 m)
- Propulsion: 2 x 2,050 hp MTU16V538TB91 MD 871/30 16-cylinder diesels, 2 shafts; 2 x GM-EMD 6-71 auxiliary diesels; 1 x 60 kW generator
- Speed: 21 knots (39 km/h) maximum
- Range: 2,300 nmi (4,300 km) maximum
- Complement: 30
- Sensors & processing systems: Furuno Navigation / Surface Search Radar
- Armament: 1 x Emerlec EX-31 30mm twin guns; 4 × M2HB Browning 12.7 mm/50-cal. GP machine guns; 2 × M60 7.62 mm/30-cal. GP machine guns

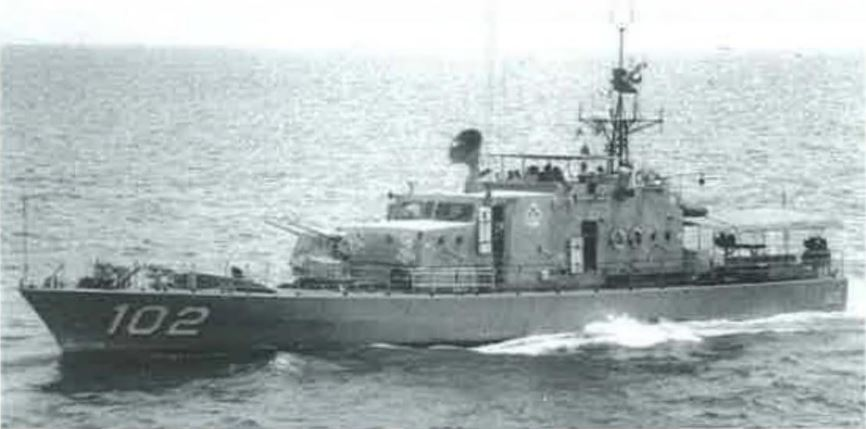
BRP Bagong Lakas, circa 1993

BRP Bagong Lakas (PB-102) was the second ship of the Kagitingan class coastal patrol interdiction crafts of the Philippine Navy. It was designed and built in Germany, and was commissioned with the Philippine Navy in February 1979 as RPS Bagong Lakas (P-102).

It was renamed to BRP Bagong Lakas (PG-102) in 1980, and was again reclassified to BRP Bagong Lakas (PB-102) in April 2016 under the new classification standards of the Philippine Navy classifying it as a patrol boat. The ship has been decommissioned from service at an unknown date.

== Design ==
The boat and all the ships in its class was considered to be unsuccessful, and was originally designed to have a maximum speed of 28 knots, but the design failed to achieve the said speed as it was underpowered.

The boat was installed with the Selenia Orion RTN-10X fire control radar and Selenia Elsag NA-10 Mod.0 gunfire control system, but it appears that they have been removed.
