= Kagitingan-class patrol craft =

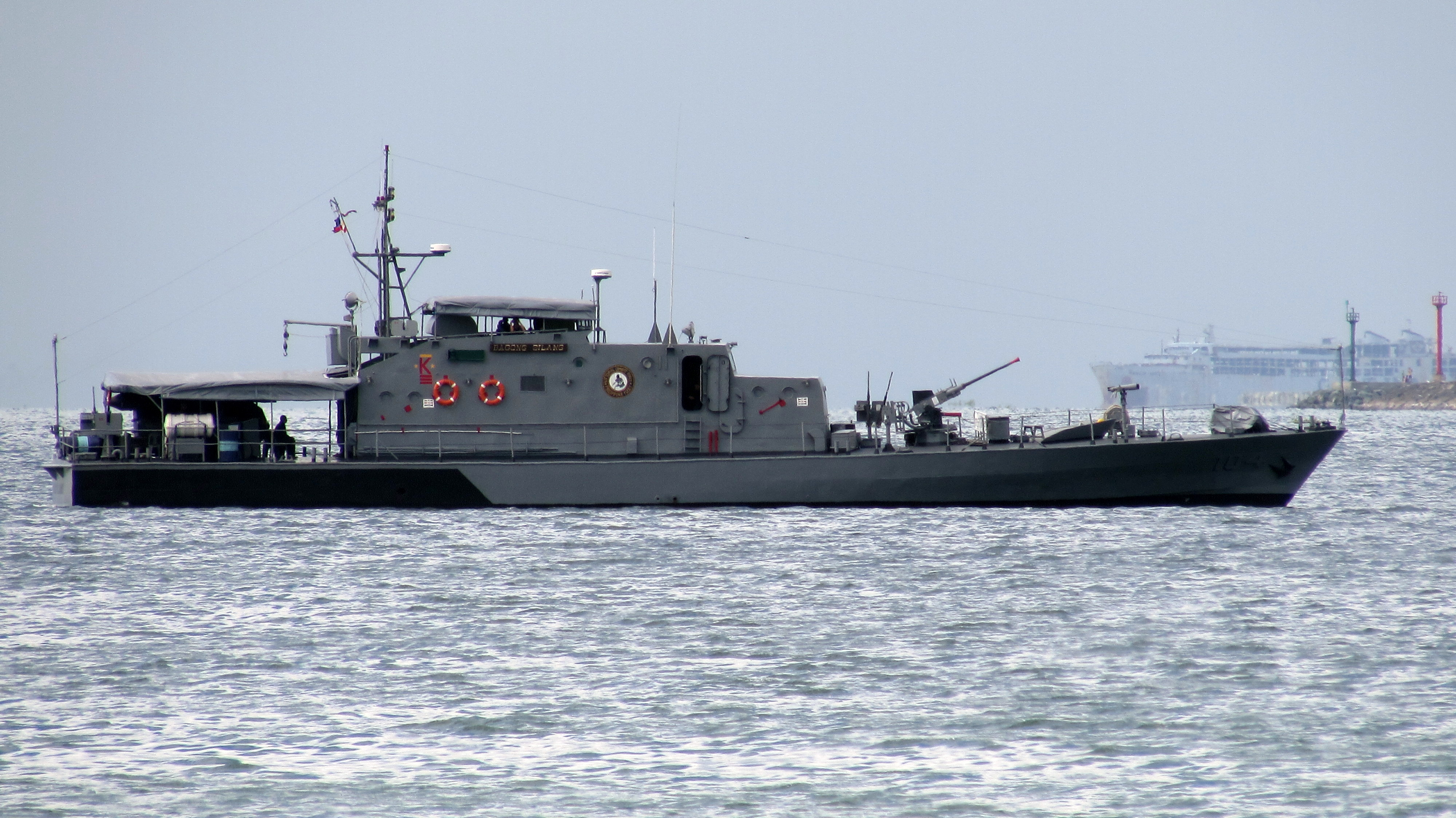
- PG-104 BRP Bagong Silang, a Kagitingan-class patrol boat of the Philippine Navy on patrol in Manila Bay during the 2015 APEC Summit.

Class overview
- Name: Kagitingan class
- Builders: W. Muller Shipyard, Hamelin, Germany (PG-101 & PG-102); Cavite Naval Shipyard, Cavite City, Philippines (PG-103 & PG-104)
- Operators: Philippine Navy
- Planned: 6
- Completed: 4
- Canceled: 2
- Active: 1
- Retired: 3

General characteristics
- Type: Coastal Patrol Interdiction Craft
- Displacement: 160 tons full load
- Propulsion: 2 × 2,050 hp MTU16V538TB91 MD 871/30 16-cylinder diesels; 2 × GM-EMD 6-71 auxiliary diesels; 2 shafts; 60 kW generator
- Speed: 21 knots (39 km/h) maximum
- Range: 2,300 nmi (4,300 km)
- Complement: 30
- Sensors & processing systems: Furuno I-band navigation/surface search radar; Selenia Elsag NA 10 Mod.0 GFCS; Orion 10X fire control radar
- Armament: 1 × Emerlec EX-31 30mm/75 caliber twin guns; 1 x Bofors Mark 3 40mm/60 caliber gun (on PB-104 only); 4 × 12.7 mm HMG; 2 x 7.62 mm GPMG

The Kagitingan class is a ship class of coastal patrol boats currently in service with the Philippine Navy.

== History ==
The Kagitingan class was designed in Germany on contract to the Philippine Navy in the 1970s with the intention of eventual production in the Philippines. The first vessel, produced by W. Muller Shipyards in Hamelan, Germany was commissioned as RPS Kagitingan (P-101) in September 1979.

The vessels had a displacement of 132 tons and a top speed of 16 knots (30 km/h; 18 mph). The main armament was a single powered Emerlec EX 34 Mod 0 turret with two 30 mm cannons mounted forward of the main superstructure. The weapon system linked to an Elsag NA10 Mod 0 fire control system and Orion 10X fire control radar. Four .50 caliber and two 7.62 mm machine guns complimented this system. Philippine sailors were sent to Europe to familiarize themselves with this new system, unlike the existing manually operated turrets with manual fire control systems.

Sources differ about whether BRP Bagong Lakas (PG-102) was built in Germany or at Cavite Shipyard in the Philippines. Bagong Lakas was commissioned at the same time as Kagitingan. Another member of the class, BRP Katapangan (PG-103), entered service in 1982 after being constructed at either Cavite Shipyard. A fourth hull, BRP Bagong Silang (PG-104) was launched at Cavite, and was commissioned in 1983. The other two planned ships in the class were canceled.

In 1984 the first ship of the PG Emilio Aguinaldo class was laid down, featuring a superstructure almost identical to that of the Kagitingan class. In the end two ships of that class were built, suggesting the possibility that the superstructures had reused from the other two planned ships in the class.

The Philippine Navy reportedly had problems keeping sailors training in their fire control and radar systems, which were themselves hard to maintain. The vessels were also grossly overpowered, having reportedly been designed with a top speed of 28 knots (52 km/h; 32 mph) in mind.

All Kagitingan-class vessels were out of service by 1992. Due to a pressing need the ships were rehabilitated and re-commissioned in 1994 as part of a broad increase in military funding.

The ships rehabilitated as a result are unclear. Some sources suggested that PG-102 had been overhauled and PG-104 overhauled and commissioned as a result, but only the PG-104 is confirmed to be in service as per the latest picture evidence. Other sources reported PG-101, PG-102, and PG-103 still in service as of 2007. Documents provided by the ROTC program at De La Salle University in Manila suggested that in fact PG-101, PG-102, and PG-104 were the vessels remaining in inventory. The status of PG-101 and PG-103 were unclear, with some sources suggesting the former had been de-commissioned in 2004, rusting away at Cavite Naval Shipyard, while the latter was being used in a reserve or training capacity, or as a spare for the remaining operational vessels.

During Balikatan 2006 the United States Navy's Mobile Diving Salvage Unit One (MDSU-1) and the Philippine Navy's Underwater Construction Team, Naval Construction Brigade conducted a combined salvage operation on a Kagitingan-class vessel at Cavite Shipyard. It is unclear which member of the class this was. Had PG-101 languished away at Cavite after being removed from service in 2004, this would likely have been the ship in question.

In November 2008 the Philippine Navy opened a contract for bidding valued at over 7 million Philippine pesos for materials for the repair of Bagong Lakas. As of 2009 three vessels in the class were said to remain in the inventory of the Philippine Navy, but their operational status was unclear.

== Technical details ==
The class has an unsuccessful design, underpowered being not able to achieve design speed of 28 knots (52 km/h; 32 mph). Hull is of semi-planing type marine grade mild steel with a round mid body and a flat afterplane. Superstructure is marine aluminum alloy. Main deck watertight from stem to stern and to shell. Pilothouse steering and propulsion controls arranged to permit one-man controls. Communications systems installed adjacent to the pilot house and make them readily accessible.

The main armament was a single powered Emerlec EX 34 Mod 0 turret with two 30mm cannons mounted forward of the main superstructure. The weapon system linked to an Selenia Elsag NA-10 Mod 0 fire control system and Selenia Orion 10X fire control radar. Four .50 caliber and two 7.62mm machine guns complimented this system. Philippine sailors were sent to Europe to familiarize themselves with this new system, unlike the existing manually operated turrets with manual fire control systems.

PG 102 and 104 had their Emerlec EX 34 Mod 0 turret modernized, but this was later removed from PG-104 and replaced with a Bofors 40 mm L60 gun as per the latest picture available.

== Ships in class ==
| Hull number | Ship name | Commissioned | Service | Status |
|---|---|---|---|---|
| PG-101 | BRP Kagitingan | 9 February 1979 | Patrol Force | Decommissioned |
| PB-102 | BRP Bagong Lakas | 9 February 1979 | Littoral Combat Force | Decommissioned |
| PG-103 | BRP Katapangan | ? | Patrol Force | Decommissioned |
| PB-104 | BRP Bagong Silang | June 1983 | Littoral Combat Force | Active |
